The following is a list of notable people who compose or have composed soundtrack music for films (i.e. film scores), television, video games and radio.

A 

 Michael Abels (born 1962)Get Out, Us, Bad Education
 Rod AbernethyStar Trek: Encounters, Wheelman, Rage
 Amanda Abizaid (born 1974)The 13th Alley
 J. J. Abrams (born 1966)Felicity,  Fringe
 André Abujamra (born 1965)Durval Discos, Carandiru
 Bojan Adamič (1912–1995)Valter Brani Sarajevo
 John Adams (born 1947)Matter of Heart
 Lee Adams (born 1924)
 Barry Adamson (born 1958)Lost Highway, Delusion
 Richard Addinsell (1904–1977)Goodbye, Mr. Chips, Dangerous Moonlight, Beau Brummell
 John Addison (1920–1988)Tom Jones, A Bridge Too Far
 Larry Adler (1914–2001)Genevieve
 Mirwais Ahmadzaï (born 1960)Die Another Day, Pardonnez-moi
 Air (formed 1995)The Virgin Suicides
 Yasushi Akutagawa (1925–1989)Gate of Hell, Fires on the Plain, Mount Hakkoda
 Ismo Alanko (born 1960)Taivaan tulet, Remontti
 Mazhar Alanson (born 1950)Everything's Gonna Be Great
 Damon Albarn (born 1968)Ordinary Decent Criminal, Ravenous, 101 Reykjavík
 Charles Albertine (1929–1986)
 Bob Alcivar (born 1938)Butterflies Are Free, The Crazy World of Julius Vrooder, Hysterical
 Dan Andrei Aldea (1950–2020)Nunta de piatră
 Edesio Alejandro (born 1958)Life Is to Whistle, Suite Habana, Un rey en la Habana
 Alessandro Alessandroni (1925–2017)Any Gun Can Play
 Jeff Alexander (1910–1989)The Tender Trap, Jailhouse Rock, Kid Galahad
 Van Alexander (1915–2015)
 Hugo Alfvén (1872–1960)The Girl of Solbakken, Mans kvinna
 Hossein Alizadeh (born 1951)Gabbeh, A Time for Drunken Horses, Turtles Can Fly
 Johan Alkenäs (born 1974)
 Eric Allaman
 Herb Alpert (born 1935)Trabanten
 John Altman (born 1949)The MatchMaker, Shadowlands, Little Voice
 Javier Álvarez (born 1956)Cronos
 William Alwyn (1905–1985)The Fallen Idol, Odd Man Out, Fires Were Started
 Masamichi Amano (born 1957)Battle Royale, Battle Royale II: Requiem, Giant Robo
 W. D. Amaradeva (1927–2016)Adata Vediya Heta Hondai, Delovak Athara, Getawarayo, Sikuru Tharuwa
 Alejandro Amenábar (born 1972)The Sea Inside, The Others
 Daniele Amfitheatrof (1901–1983)Lassie Come Home, Song of the South, Guest Wife
 David Amram (born 1930)The Manchurian Candidate, Splendor in the Grass
 Anamanaguchi (formed 2004)Scott Pilgrim vs. the World: The Game
 Anand Raj AnandDishayen, Masti, Masoom
 Anastasia (formed 1990)Before the Rain
 Kai Normann Andersen (1900–1967)Præsten i Vejlby, Hotel Paradis, Odds 777, Nøddebo Præstegård
 Adam Anders (born 1975)
 Murray C. AndersonIn My Country, Boy called Twist
 Benny Andersson (born 1946)Mio in the Land of Faraway, Songs from the Second Floor, You, the Living
 Michael Andrews (born 1959)Donnie Darko, Orange County, Me and You and Everyone We Know, Walk Hard: The Dewey Cox Story
 Steffan Andrews (born 1985)
 Jurriaan Andriessen (1925–1996)De aanslag, Dorp aan de rivier, De Dans van de Reiger
 George Antheil (1900–1959)In a Lonely Place, Ballet Mécanique
 Paul Antonelli (born 1959)China O'Brien, Out of the Dark
 Yoshino Aoki (born 1971)Breath of Fire III, Breath of Fire IV
 Aphex Twin (born 1971)Kuso
 Louis Applebaum (1918–2000)The Story of G.I. Joe
 Arcade Fire (formed 2001)Her 
 Archive (formed 1994)Michel Vaillant, Sep
 Takanori Arisawa (1951–2005)Sailor Moon, Digimon
 David Arkenstone (born 1952)Robot Wars, World of Warcraft: Cataclysm
 Harold Arlen (1905–1986)The Wizard of Oz
 Craig Armstrong (born 1959)Romeo + Juliet, Ray, Moulin Rouge!
 Leo Arnaud (1904–1991)The Kissing Bandit, Apache Rose, The F.B.I.
 David Arnold (born 1962)Independence Day, Quantum of Solace, Little Britain 
 Sir Malcolm Arnold (1921–2006)The Bridge on the River Kwai, Hobson's Choice, Whistle Down the Wind, The Belles of St Trinian's
 Len Arran (born 1961)Soulboy, The Truth About Love
 Jorge Arriagada (born 1943)Time Regained, Klimt, Salvador Allende
 Claude Arrieu (1903–1990)Les Gueux au paradis, Marchands de rien,  (Le Tombeur)
 Art Zoyd (formed 1968)new scores for Nosferatu, Metropolis, Häxan
 Eduard Artemyev (1937–2022)Solaris, Stalker, Burnt by the Sun, The Barber of Siberia
 Joseph Arthur (born 1971)Hell's Kitchen, Deliver Us from Evil
 Philippe Arthuys (1928–2010)The Glass Cage, The Carabineers, Le trou
 Noriyuki Asakura (born 1954)Onimusha, Way of the Samurai, Tenchu
 Assassin (formed 1985)La Haine
 Edwin Astley (1922–1998)The Saint, Danger Man, Civilisation, The Adventures of Robin Hood
 Richard AttreeHorizon, The Demon Headmaster, Watt on Earth
 Georges Auric (1899–1983)La Belle et la bete, Bonjour Tristesse, Lola Montès, The Wages of Fear, The Hunchback of Notre Dame
 Eric Avery (born 1965)Sex with Strangers, Soul Kiss
 Max Avery LichtensteinTarnation, Puzzlehead
 Roy Ayers (born 1940)Coffy
 Albert Ayler (1936–1970)New York Eye and Ear Control
 Mark Ayres (born 1961)Doctor Who
 Alexandre Azaria (born 1967)Transporter 2, Transporter 3, Astérix et les Vikings
 Lex de Azevedo (born 1943)The Swan Princess, Where the Red Fern Grows
 Charles Aznavour (1924–2018)Le cercle vicieux, L'île du bout du monde, C'est pas moi, c'est l'autre

B 

 Luis Bacalov (1933–2017)Django, Il Postino, The Gospel According to St. Matthew, Storm Rider
 Burt Bacharach (1928-2023)Casino Royale, What's New Pussycat, Butch Cassidy and the Sundance Kid, Lost Horizon
 Pierre Bachelet (1944–2005)Emmanuelle, Les Bronzés font du ski, Story of O, Emmanuelle 5
 Michael Bacon (born 1949)Loverboy, The Last Good Time, King Gimp
 Angelo Badalamenti (1937–2022)Twin Peaks, Blue Velvet, The City of Lost Children, Mulholland Drive
 Klaus Badelt (born 1967)Pirates of the Caribbean: The Curse of the Black Pearl, Equilibrium, Wu ji
 Paul Baillargeon (born 1944)Star Trek: Deep Space Nine, Star Trek: Voyager, Star Trek: Enterprise
 Tadeusz Baird (1928–1981)Lotna, Ludzie z pociagu, Pasazerka
 Constantin Bakaleinikoff (1896–1966)Higher and Higher
 Mischa Bakaleinikoff (1890–1960)Earth vs. the Flying Saucers, 20 Million Miles to Earth, It Came from Beneath the Sea
 Buddy Baker (1918–2002)The Fox and the Hound, The Apple Dumpling Gang, Napoleon and Samantha
 Lorne Balfe (born 1976) (Composer, Producer, Arranger)  Home, Penguins of Madagascar 
 Alexander Bălănescu (born 1954)Tabló, Il partigiano Johnny, Dem Himmel ganz nah
 Iain Ballamy (born 1964)MirrorMask
 Glen Ballard (born 1953)Navy SEALs, The Polar Express, Clubland
 Richard Band (born 1953)Re-Animator, Puppet Master, Stargate SG-1
 Thomas Bangalter (born 1975)Irréversible
 Don Banks (1923–1980)Die, Monster, Die!, The Reptile, Rasputin, the Mad Monk
 Claus Bantzer (born 1942)Cherry Blossoms, Männer...
 Billy Barber
 Lesley Barber (born 1968)You Can Count on Me, Mansfield Park, Little Bear
 Gato Barbieri (1934–2016)Last Tango in Paris
 Blixa Bargeld (born 1959)To Have & to Hold, Jonas in the Desert, Recycled
 James Edward Barker (born 1980)Psych 9, The Drought, The Vanishment
 Warren Barker (1923–2006)Bewitched
 Andrew Barnabas (born 1973)MediEvil, Primal
 Erran Baron Cohen (born 1968)Borat: Cultural Learnings of America for Make Benefit Glorious Nation of Kazakhstan, Brüno, Da Ali G Show
 Nathan Barr (born 1973)Cabin Fever, Hostel, True Blood
 Alejandro Gutiérrez del Barrio (1895–1964)Pachamama, Bendita seas, Los Peores del barrio
 Bebe Barron (1925–2008)Forbidden Planet
 Louis Barron (1920–1989)Forbidden Planet
 Jeff Barry (born 1938)
 John Barry (1933–2011)Goldfinger, You Only Live Twice, Out of Africa, Midnight Cowboy
 Steve Bartek (born 1952)Novocaine, Romy and Michele's High School Reunion, Desperate Housewives
 Dee Barton (1937–2001)High Plains Drifter, Play Misty for Me, Thunderbolt and Lightfoot, Death Screams
 Stephen Barton (born 1982)Call of Duty 4: Modern Warfare, The Six Wives of Henry Lefay
 Eef Barzelay (born 1970)Rocket Science, Rudderless
 Jules Bass (1935–2022)The Wacky World of Mother Goose, The Wind in the Willows
 George Bassman (1914–1997)A Day at the Races, Middle of the Night, Producers' Showcase
 Tyler Bates (born 1965)300, Watchmen, Sucker Punch, The Devil's Rejects
 Hubert Bath (1883–1945)Tudor Rose, A Yank at Oxford, Millions Like Us
 Mark BatsonBad Boys II, Beauty Shop, War
 Mike Batt (born 1949)Caravans, Watership Down, The Dreamstone, Keep the Aspidistra Flying
 Julián Bautista (1901–1961)La Dama del millón, Café Cantante, La maestrita de los obreros
 Arnold Bax (1883–1953)Oliver Twist, Malta, G. C.
 Les Baxter (1922–1996)Wild in the Streets, Dr. Goldfoot and the Girl Bombs, The Dunwich Horror, Black Sunday
 Babak Bayat (1946–2006)
 Stephen Baysted (born 1969)GTR 2 – FIA GT Racing Game, GT Legends
 Jeff Beal (born 1963)Monk, Pollock
 John Beal (born 1947)Vegas, The Funhouse, Eight Is Enough, Happy Days, Terror in the Aisles
 Robin Beanland (born 1968)Conker's Bad Fur Day, Conker: Live and Reloaded
 Guy Béart (1930–2015)Girl and the River, Manon des Sources, Une souris chez les hommes
 John Beasley (born 1960)
 Bobby Beausoleil (born 1947)Lucifer Rising
 Giuseppe Becce (1877–1973)The Cabinet of Dr. Caligari, Der letzte Mann, Tiefland
 Beck (born 1970)Scott Pilgrim vs. the World
 Christophe Beck (born 1972)Buffy the Vampire Slayer, Elektra, The Pink Panther, Waiting for "Superman"
 Jeff Beck (born 1944)Frankie's House
 David Bell (born 1954)Star Trek: Enterprise, Murder, She Wrote
 Belle & Sebastian (formed 1996)Storytelling
 Andrew BellingWizards, Starchaser: The Legend of Orin, Hangar 18
 Richard Bellis (born 1946)Stephen King's It, Heart of the Storm
 Roger Bellon
 Marco Beltrami (born 1966)Scream, The Hurt Locker, I, Robot, 3:10 to Yuma
 Arthur Benjamin (1893–1960)The Man Who Knew Too Much, An Ideal Husband, Above Us the Waves, Fire Down Below
 Richard Rodney Bennett (1936–2012)Murder on the Orient Express, Far from the Madding Crowd, Four Weddings and a Funeral
 Alan and Marilyn Bergman (born 1925 and 1929-2022)
 David Bergeaud (born 1968)Prince Valiant, Ratchet & Clank, The Outer Limits
 Irving Berlin (1888–1989)Top Hat, Holiday Inn, Easter Parade
 James Bernard (1925–2001)Horror of Dracula, Taste the Blood of Dracula, The Devil Rides Out, The Curse of Frankenstein
 Charles Bernstein (born 1943)A Nightmare on Elm Street, Cujo, White Lightning
 Elmer Bernstein (1922–2004)The Ten Commandments, The Magnificent Seven, To Kill a Mockingbird, Far from Heaven
 Leonard Bernstein (1918–1990)On the Waterfront, West Side Story
 Peter Bernstein (born 1961)
 Adam Berry (born 1966)South Park, Balto II: Wolf Quest, Kim Possible
 The Besnard Lakes (formed 2003)Sympathy for Delicious
 Peter Best (born 1943)"Crocodile" Dundee, Doing Time for Patsy Cline, The Adventures of Barry McKenzie
 Henri Betti (1917–2005)His Father's Portrait
 Harry Betts (1922–2012)Black Mama, White Mama, The Fantastic Plastic Machine
 Vishal Bhardwaj (born 1960)The Blue Umbrella, Omkara, Godmother
 Amin Bhatia (born 1961)Iron Eagle II, Queer as Folk, The Zack Files
 Vanraj Bhatia (1927–2021)Jaya Ganga, Ankur, Manthan, Junoon
 Christian Biegai (born 1974)Eagle vs Shark, Whistle
 Biosphere (born 1962)Eternal Stars, Insomnia, Man with a Movie Camera
 Magnus BirgerssonMirror's Edge
 Joseph Bishara (born 1970)11–11–11, The Conjuring, Dark Skies, Insidious
 Anil Biswas (1914–2003)Kismet, Aurat, Journey Beyond Three Seas
 Bruno Bizarro (born 1979)A Vida Privada de Salazar, O Último Tesouro, Substantia
 Ragnar Bjerkreim (born 1958)Kamilla and the Thief
 Björk (born 1965)Dancer in the Dark, Drawing Restraint 9
 Bleeding Fingers Music
 Stanley Black (1913–2002)Laughter in Paradise, Summer Holiday, The Young Ones
 Richard Blackford (born 1954)House of Harmony, The Shell Seekers
 Howard Blake (born 1938)The Bear, The Duellists, Flash Gordon, The Snowman
 Art Blakey (1919–1990)Des femmes disparaissent, Man Outside, Stop Driving Us Crazy
 Terence Blanchard (born 1962)Inside Man, Malcolm X, Clockers, Sugar Hill
 Jamie Blanks (born 1971)Storm Warning, Long Weekend
 Teddy Blass (born 1984)Byoukimon, Chain Shooter, Fortune's Prime
 Erik Blicker (born 1964)
 Arthur Bliss (1891–1975)Things to Come, Men of Two Worlds, Seven Waves Away
 Blue Öyster Cult (formed 1967)Bad Channels
 Len Blum (born 1951)East End Hustle
 Armando Bó (1914–1981)Fuego, Una Mariposa en la noche, La Leona
 Wes BoatmanGuiding Light, The Banger Sisters, As the World Turns
 Michael Boddicker (born 1953)The Adventures of Buckaroo Banzai Across the 8th Dimension, White Water Summer, The Adventures of Milo and Otis
 Todd Boekelheide (born 1954) 3 1/2 Minutes, 10 Bullets, Ballets Russes
 Ed Bogas (born 1942)Fritz the Cat, Heavy Traffic, Bon Voyage, Charlie Brown (and Don't Come Back!!)
 Claude Bolling (1930–2020)Borsalino, California Suite, Daisy Town
 Bertrand Bonello (born 1968)The Pornographer, De la guerre, House of Tolerance
 Bernardo Bonezzi (1964–2012)Law of Desire, Women on the Verge of a Nervous Breakdown, Nobody Will Speak of Us When We're Dead
 Luiz Bonfá (1922–2001)Black Orpheus
 Fred Bongusto (1935–2019)Malicious, Fantozzi contro tutti, Superfantozzi
 Raichand Boral (1903–1982)Mahobbat Ke Aansu, Dhoop Chhaon, Swami Vivekanand
 Simon Boswell (born 1956)Santa Sangre, Dust Devil, Tin Man
 Perry Botkin Jr. (1933–2021)Skyjacked, Tarzan, the Ape Man
 Martin Böttcher (1927–2019)Winnetou, Derrick, Das schwarze Schaf
 Frédéric Botton (1937–2008)Hunting and Gathering
 Roddy Bottum (born 1963)Adam & Steve, What Goes Up, Kabluey
 Ned Bouhalassa (born 1962)Fries with That?, 15/Love
 Pierre Boulez (1925–2016)La symphonie mécanique, Le Soleil des eaux
 Pieter BourkeThe Insider, Ali
 David Bowie (1947–2016)Labyrinth, The Buddha of Suburbia, Omikron: The Nomad Soul
 Euel Box (1928–2017)Benji, For the Love of Benji, Oh! Heavenly Dog
 Boyce and Hart (born 1939)
 Scott Bradley (1891–1977)Tom and Jerry, Droopy, Barney Bear
 Steven BramsonThe Young Indiana Jones Chronicles, NCIS, The Nine
 Glenn Branca (born 1948)The Belly of an Architect
 Otto Brandenburg (1934–2007)Villa Vennely
 Angelo Branduardi (born 1950)Momo
 Stephen Bray (born 1956)Who's That Girl, Psycho III
 Michael BreckenridgeJune Cabin, The Briefcase, Bloodletting: Life, Death and Health Care
 Buddy Bregman (1930–2017)The Delicate Delinquent, Five Guns West, Guns, Girls, and Gangsters
 Goran Bregović (born 1950)Time of the Gypsies, Underground
 Joseph Carl Breil (1870–1926)The Birth of a Nation, Les Amours de la reine Élisabeth
 Willem Breuker (1944–2010)De illusionist, De IJssalon, Het teken van het beest
 Philip Brigham (born 1952)Road to Salina, The Adventures of Pete & Pete
 Jon Brion (born 1963)Magnolia, Punch-Drunk Love, Eternal Sunshine of the Spotless Mind
 Benjamin Britten (1913–1976)Night Mail
 Jeff Britting (born 1957)Ayn Rand: A Sense of Life
 Broadcast (formed 1995)Berberian Sound Studio
 Timothy Brock (born 1963)new music for silent films Sunrise: A Song of Two Humans, Faust, Berlin: Symphony of a Metropolis
 Michael Brook (born 1951)An Inconvenient Truth, Into the Wild
 Eric BrosiusSystem Shock 2, Thief: The Dark Project, Guitar Hero
 Dirk Brossé (born 1960)Daens, When the Light Comes, A Peasant's Psalm
 Bruce Broughton (born 1945)Silverado, Lost in Space, Young Sherlock Holmes
 Leo Brouwer (born 1939)Like Water for Chocolate, La última cena, CSI: NY
 Russell BrowerWorld of Warcraft: Wrath of the Lich King, Joint Operations: Typhoon Rising, Diablo III
 Bill Brown (born 1969)Tom Clancy's Rainbow Six, Return to Castle Wolfenstein, CSI: NY
 Dennis C. BrownDharma & Greg
 James Brown (1933–2006)Black Caesar, Slaughter's Big Rip-Off
 Larry Brown (born 1947)
 Dave Brubeck (1920–2012)Mr. Broadway, This Is America, Charlie Brown, Ordeal by Innocence
 George Bruns (1914–1983)Sleeping Beauty, The Jungle Book, Robin Hood
 Joanna Bruzdowicz (born 1943)Vagabond, Jacquot de Nantes
 Gavin Bryars (born 1943)A Song of Love, Central Bazaar, Smert v Pensne ili nash Chekhov
 BT (born 1971)Go, The Fast and the Furious, Monster, Stealth
 Chico Buarque (born 1944)Garota De Ipanema, Dona Flor e Seus Dois Maridos, Os Saltimbancos Trapalhões
 David Buckley (born 1976)Blood Creek, The Forbidden Kingdom, From Paris with Love
 Paul Buckmaster (1946–2017)12 Monkeys, Son of Dracula, Out-of-Sync, Most Wanted, The Rainbow Warrior
 Harold Budd (1936–2020)Mysterious Skin
 Roy Budd (1947–1993)Get Carter, Zeppelin, The Carey Treatment, The Sea Wolves, Who Dares Wins
 Peter Buffett (born 1958)The Tillamook Treasure, For the Next 7 Generations, Sky Dancers
 Bun BunBreath of Fire, Metal Slug 1st Mission, Mega Man 3
 Roman Bunka (1951–2022)Paul Bowles – Halbmond, ¿Bin ich schön?
 Velton Ray Bunch (born 1948)Magnum, P.I., JAG, Nash Bridges
 Geoffrey Burgon (1941–2010)Brideshead Revisited, Monty Python's Life of Brian, The Chronicles of Narnia
 Rahul Dev Burman (1939–1994)Teesri Manzil, Padosan, Baharon Ke Sapne
 Sachin Dev Burman (1906–1975)Baazi, Shabnam, Pyaasa
 J. J. Burnel (born 1952)Gankutsuou: The Count of Monte Cristo
 Justin Burnett (born 1973)SOCOM U.S. Navy SEALs: Confrontation, SOCOM U.S. Navy SEALs: Fireteam Bravo 2, Syphon Filter: Logan's Shadow
 T Bone Burnett (born 1948)O Brother, Where Art Thou?, Walk the Line, Don't Come Knocking
 Jeff & Greg Burns (born 1969)
 Ralph Burns (1922–2001)Lenny, All That Jazz, Star 80
 Carter Burwell (born 1954)Fargo, Being John Malkovich, Blood Simple, True Grit, Miller's Crossing
 David Buttolph (1902–1982)Maverick, Kiss of Death, The Virginian
 Joseph Byrd (born 1937)Lions Love, Health, The Ghost Dance
 David Byrne (born 1952)The Last Emperor, Young Adam, Big Love

 C 

 John Cacavas (1930–2014)Kojak, Horror Express, The Bionic Woman
 John Cage (1912–1992)Dreams That Money Can Buy, Works of Calder
 Peter CalandraJellysmoke, Unknown Soldier
 Jesús Calderón (born 1976)Dos Hombres y un Motor, Tin Can Heart, Las Bellas Durmientes
 John Cale (born 1942)American Psycho, I Shot Andy Warhol, A Burning Hot Summer
 Charles Calello (born 1938)
 Cali (born 1968)J'ai oublié de te dire
 Sean Callery (born 1964)24, Homeland, La Femme Nikita
 Gérard Calvi (1922–2015)Asterix the Gaul, Asterix and Cleopatra, The Twelve Tasks of Asterix
 Pino Calvi (1930–1989)Senza Rete
 Pedro Macedo Camacho (born 1979)Audiosurf, A Vampyre Story, Star Citizen
 Francisco Canaro (1888–1964)He nacido en Buenos Aires, Explosivo 008, Con la música en el alma
 Bruno Canfora (1924–2017)The Man Who Wagged His Tail, It Happened in Broad Daylight
 Paul Cantelon (born 1959)The Diving Bell and the Butterfly, W., The Other Boleyn Girl
 Claudio Capponi (born 1959)Jane Eyre, My House in Umbria
 Al Capps (1938–2018)
 Xhol Caravan (1967–1972)Das Unheil, Wir – zwei
 David CarbonaraMad Men, Fast Food Fast Women, The Guru
 Gerard Carbonara (1886–1959)The Kansan, Stagecoach
 Sam CardonThe Work and the Glory, Mystic India
 Wendy Carlos (born 1939)A Clockwork Orange, Tron, The Shining
 Larry Carlton (born 1948)Hill Street Blues, Against All Odds
 John Carpenter (born 1948)Halloween, The Fog, Escape from New York
 Pete Carpenter (1914–1987)Bewitched, Gomer Pyle, U.S.M.C., The Andy Griffith Show
 Joey Carbone
 Hans Carste (1909–1971)Tagesschau, Im schwarzen Rößl, Spring in Berlin
 Benny Carter (1907–2003)A Man Called Adam, Buck and the Preacher, The Alfred Hitchcock Hour
 Gaylord Carter (1905–2000)Little Lord Fauntleroy, Directed by John Ford
 Kristopher Carter (born 1972)Batman Beyond, Batman: The Brave and the Bold, Young Justice
 Doreen Carwithen (1922–2003)Harvest from the Wilderness, Boys in Brown, Mantrap
 Tristram Cary (1925–2008)The Ladykillers, Quatermass and The Pit, The Boy Who Stole a Million
 Johnny Cash (1932–2003)I Walk the Line, Little Fauss and Big Halsey
 Ronald Cass (1923–2006)Summer Holiday, The Young Ones
 Patrick Cassidy (born 1956)
 Teddy Castellucci (born 1965)The Wedding Singer, Big Daddy, Little Nicky
 Mario Castelnuovo-Tedesco (1895–1968)The Loves of Carmen, Time Out of Mind
 Nick Cave (born 1957)Ghosts... of the Civil Dead, The Assassination of Jesse James by the Coward Robert, The Road
 Ryan Cayabyab (born 1954)Kahapon, May Dalawang Bata, Misis Mo, Misis Ko, Azucena
 Chakri (born 1974)Satyam, Chukkallo Chandrudu, Jai Bolo Telangana
 Frankie Chan (born 1955)The Prodigal Son, Chungking Express, Fallen Angels
 Chan Kwong-wing (born 1967)Infernal Affairs, The Warlords, The Storm Riders
 François-Eudes Chanfrault (born 1974)Haute Tension, Inside, Donkey Punch
 Gary Chang (born 1953)Eerie, Indiana, Under Siege, Sniper, The Island of Dr. Moreau
 Charlie Chaplin (1889–1977)Modern Times, Limelight, City Lights, The Gold Rush, A Countess from Hong Kong
 Benoît Charest (born 1964)The Triplets of Belleville, Adam's Wall, Polytechnique
 John Charles (born 1940)Utu, The Quiet Earth, Spooked
 Ken Chastain (born 1964)M@d About, Invention
 Stuart Chatwood (born 1969)Prince of Persia: The Sands of Time, Prince of Persia: Warrior Within, Prince of Persia: The Two Thrones
 Jay Chattaway (born 1946)Maniac, Missing in Action, Star Trek: The Next Generation
 Matthieu Chedid (born 1971)Tell No One, Un monstre à Paris
 Yekaterina Chemberdzhi (born 1960)
 The Chemical Brothers (formed 1991)Hanna
 Yury G. Chernavsky (born 1947)Investigation Held by Kolobki, Sezon chudes, Vyshe radugi
 Don Cherry (1936–1995)The Holy Mountain
 Paul Chihara (born 1938)Death Race 2000, The Bad News Bears Go to Japan, The Darker Side of Terror
 Ghulam Ahmed Chishti (1905–1994)Sohni Mahival, Deen-o-Dunya, Shukriya
 Chitragupta (1917–1991)Bhabi, Ganga Maiyya Tohe Piyari Chadhaibo, Oonche Log, Sansar
 Salil Chowdhury (1922–1995)Do Bigha Zamin, Chhoti Si Baat, Doorathu Idhi Muzhakkam
 Sandeep ChowtaNinne Pelladutha, Shanti Shanti Shanti, Kaun
 Jamie ChristophersonOnimusha: Dawn of Dreams, Bionic Commando, Lost Planet
 Toby Chu (born 1977)The Riches, Covert Affairs, Domino
 Frank Churchill (1901–1942)Bambi, Snow White and the Seven Dwarves, Dumbo
 Keefus Ciancia (born 1972)The Poughkeepsie Tapes, Saving Grace, Diana
 Suzanne Ciani (born 1946)The Incredible Shrinking Woman, Rainbow's Children, One Life to Live
 Alessandro Cicognini (1906–1995)Umberto D., The Last Judgement, It Started in Naples
 Grzegorz Ciechowski (1957–2001)The Hexer, Schloß Pompon Rouge, Stan Strachu
 Simone Cilio (born 1992)
 The Cinematic Orchestra (formed 1997)The Crimson Wing: Mystery of the Flamingos, new score for Man with a Movie Camera
 Stelvio Cipriani (1937–2018)The Anonymous Venetian, Concorde Affaire '79, Twitch of the Death Nerve
 Julien CivangeRoberto Succo, Looking for Jimmy, Choses secrètes
 Dolores Claman (1927–2021)Hockey Night in Canada, The Man Who Wanted to Live Forever, Captain Apache
 Clannad (formed 1970)Robin of Sherwood, The Angel and the Soldier Boy, The Natural World: Atlantic Realm
 James Kenelm Clarke (born 1941)All These People, About Anglia, Got It Made
 Malcolm Clarke (1943–2003)Earthshock, The Sea Devils
 Stanley Clarke (born 1951)The Transporter, A Man Called Hawk, Soul Food: The Series
 Alf Clausen (born 1941)The Simpsons, Moonlighting, ALF
 Climax Golden Twins (formed 1993)Session 9, The Mangler Reborn, The Dark Chronicles, Chained
 George S. Clinton (born 1947)Austin Powers, The Astronaut's Wife, Wild Things, Mortal Kombat
 Charlie Clouser (born 1963)Saw, NUMB3RS, The Stepfather, Resident Evil: Extinction
 Elia Cmiral (born 1950)Ronin, Nash Bridges, Atlas Shrugged: Part I
 Eric Coates (1886–1957)The Dam Busters, The Selfish Giant, The Three Bears
 Bob Cobert (1924–2020)Dark Shadows, The Night Stalker, Burnt Offerings, Scalpel, The Winds of War
 John Coda
 Harvey Cohen (1951–2007)
 Coil (formed 1982)The Angelic Conversation, Blue, Gay Man's Guide to Safer Sex
 Ozan Çolakoğlu (born 1972)G.O.R.A., Organize İşler, Sınav
 Ray Colcord (1949–2016)227, The Devonsville Terror
 Jude Cole (born 1960)Truth or Consequences, N.M., Last Light, Woman Wanted
 Cy Coleman (1929–2004)Playboy After Dark
 Lisa Coleman (born 1960)Crossing Jordan, Heroes, Dangerous Minds
 Cyril Collard (1957–1993)Savage Nights
 Anthony Vincent Collins (1893–1963)Swiss Family Robinson, I Live in Grosvenor Square, Trent's Last Case
 Phil Collins (born 1951)Tarzan, Brother Bear
 Michel Colombier (1939–2004)The Golden Child, Une chambre en ville, Against All Odds
 Juan J. Colomer (born 1966)A Day Without a Mexican, A Letter to Rachel, Dark Honeymoon
 Zebedy Colt (1929–2004)The Story of Joanna, Manhole
 Peter Connelly (born 1972)Tomb Raider: The Angel of Darkness, Flesh Feast, Mass Destruction
 Carol Connors (born 1941)
 Con Conrad (1891–1938)The Gay Divorcee, Here's to Romance, Palmy Days
 Marius Constant (1925–2004)The Twilight Zone, Le chemin de Damas, Tomorrow's World
 Paul Constantinescu (1909–1963)O noapte furtunoasa, Rasuna valea, La 'Moara cu noroc'
 Bill Conti (born 1942)Rocky, The Right Stuff, The Karate Kid
 Ry Cooder (born 1947)Johnny Handsome, Paris, Texas, Crossroads
 Jason Cooper (born 1967)From Within, Without Gorky
 Ray Cooper (born 1945)Fear and Loathing in Las Vegas
 Stewart Copeland (born 1952)Talk Radio, Wall Street, Highlander II: The Quickening
 Aaron Copland (1900–1990)Of Mice and Men, The North Star, The Heiress
 Cecil Copping (1888–1966)The Lost World, The Private Life of Helen of Troy, The Love Racket
 Normand Corbeil (1956–2013)Frankenstein
 Michael Corcoran (born 1972)
 Frank Cordell (1928–1980)The Rebel, Ring of Bright Water, God Told Me To
 John Corigliano (born 1938)Altered States, Revolution, The Red Violin
 Bruno Coulais (born 1954)The Crimson Rivers, The Chorus, Coraline
 Vladimir Cosma (born 1940)The Mad Adventures of Rabbi Jacob, La boum, Diva
 Alec R. Costandinos (born 1944)Trocadéro bleu citron, Caravane, Les derniers jours de la victime
 Alexander Courage (1919–2008)Star Trek: The Original Series, The Left Handed Gun, Day of the Outlaw
 Crush 40 (formed 1997)Sonic Adventure, Shadow the Hedgehog, Sonic Heroes
 The Crystal Method (formed 1993)N2O: Nitrous Oxide, London, X Games 3D: The Movie
 Douglas J. Cuomo (born 1958)Homicide: Life on the Street, Sex and the City, Crazy Love
 Mike Curb (born 1944)Skaterdater, The Wild Angels, The Born Losers
 Joseph Curiale (born 1955)
 Hoyt Curtin (1922–2000)The Flintstones, Jonny Quest, The Jetsons
 Leah Curtis Exitus Roma, To Rest in Peace

D 

 John D'Andrea
 Juan d'Arienzo (1900–1976)Melodías porteñas, Gente bien
 Dan the Automator (born 1966) SSX 3 Omakasse, Clarrysney 
 Daft Punk (formed 1993)Tron: Legacy
 Ben Daglish (born 1966)Gauntlet, Deflektor, The Last Ninja
 V. Dakshinamoorthy (1919–2013)Nalla Thanka, Mizhikal Sakshi, Navalokam
 Burkhard Dallwitz (born 1959)The Truman Show, CrashBurn, The Way Back
 Đặng Hữu Phúc (born 1953)Thời xa vắng, Mùa ổi, Gate, gate, paragate
 Britt Daniel (born 1971)Stranger than Fiction
 John Dankworth (1927–2010)Saturday Night and Sunday Morning, Modesty Blaise, Tomorrow's World
 Jeff Danna (born 1964)The Boondock Saints, O, Resident Evil: Apocalypse
 Mychael Danna (born 1958)8mm, The Ice Storm, Monsoon Wedding
 Danny! (born 1983)
 Ken Darby (1909–1992)Rancho Notorious, Meet Me After the Show, The Adventures of Jim Bowie
 Mason Daring  (born 1949)Return of the Secaucus 7, The Brother from Another Planet, Eight Men Out
 David Darling (born 1941)Into the Deep: America, Whaling & the World, Kedma, Going Under
 Samar Das (1929–2001)Mukh O Mukhosh, Asiya, Dhirey Bahey Meghna
 Peter DasentMeet the Feebles, Braindead, Heavenly Creatures
 Vladimir Dashkevich (born 1934)Sherlock Holmes and Dr. Watson, Niotkuda s lyubovyu, ili Vesyolye pokhorony, Prodleniye roda
 Evelyne DatlThe Adventures of Dudley the Dragon, The Big Comfy Couch, What's for Dinner?
 Gerhard Daum (born 1956) Felon
 Shaun Davey (born 1948)Waking Ned, The Tailor of Panama, The Abduction Club
 Iva Davies (born 1955)Razorback, Master and Commander: The Far Side of the World, The Incredible Journey of Mary Bryant
 Peter Maxwell Davies (1934–2016)The Devils, The Boy Friend
 Carl Davis (born 1936)The French Lieutenant's Woman, new music for Intolerance
 Don Davis (born 1957)The Matrix, House on Haunted Hill, Behind Enemy Lines
 Jonathan Davis (born 1971)Queen of the Damned
 Miles Davis (1926–1991)Elevator to the Gallows, Siesta, Dingo
 Guido De Angelis (born 1944)Yor, the Hunter from the Future, Sandokan, Watch Out, We're Mad!
 Maurizio De Angelis (born 1947)Yor, the Hunter from the Future, Sandokan, Watch Out, We're Mad!
 Mark De Gli AntoniCherish, Marie and Bruce, Into the Abyss
 Francesco De Masi (1930–2005)Arizona Colt, Private Vices, Public Pleasures, The New York Ripper
 Tullio De Piscopo (born 1946)L'arma, I guappi non si toccano, 32 dicembre
 Frank De Vol (1911–1999)Hush... Hush, Sweet Charlotte, The Flight of the Phoenix, What Ever Happened to Baby Jane?
 Barry De Vorzon (born 1934)Dillinger, The Warriors, Xanadu, S.W.A.T.
 Dan Deacon (born 1981)Twixt, Hilvarenbeek
 Dead Can Dance (formed 1981)Moon Child, In the Presence of Mine Enemies, Ruth's Journey
 Dick DeBenedictis (born 1937)Perry Mason, Police Story, Columbo
 John Debney (born 1956)Cutthroat Island, The Passion of the Christ, Iron Man 2, Ice Age: Collision Course
 Charles Deenen (born 1970)Double Dragon, Xain'd Sleena, Zamzara
 Deep Forest (formed 1992)Strange Days, Le prince du Pacifique, Kusa no ran
 Jack Delano (1914–1997)Los Peloteros
 Georges Delerue (1925–1992)Hiroshima mon amour, Jules and Jim, Contempt, The Last Metro
 Jaime Delgado Aparicio (1943–1983)El embajador y yo
 Joe Delia (born 1948)Bad Lieutenant, King of New York, Dangerous Game
 Norman Dello Joio (1913–2008)Air Power, The Smashing of the Reich, A Golden Prison: The Louvre 
 Julie Delpy (born 1969)J'ai peur, j'ai mal, je meurs, 2 Days in Paris, The Countess
 Milton DeLugg (1918–2015)Santa Claus Conquers the Martians, The Gong Show, Treasure Hunt
 Éric Demarsan (born 1938)Army of Shadows, Le Cercle rouge, Les Spécialistes
 Eumir Deodato (born 1943)Bossa Nova
 Olivier Deriviere (born 1978)Alone in the Dark, Obscure, Phileas Fortune
 Jean Derome (born 1955)Passiflora, When I Will Be Gone (L'Âge de braise), De ma fenêtre, sans maison...
 Russ DeSalvoBarbie Diaries
 Alexandre Desplat (born 1961)The Painted Veil, The King's Speech, Girl with a Pearl Earring, Lust, Caution
 Paul Dessau (1894–1979)Alice und ihre Feuerwehr, Stürme über dem Mont Blanc, Taras Bulba
 Adolph Deutsch (1897–1980)The Maltese Falcon, Some Like It Hot, The Apartment
 Stephen Deutsch (born 1945)The Signalman, The History of Mr. Polly, Bye Bye Columbus
 Deva (born 1950)Aasai, Kushi, The Prince
 Srikanth DevaKuththu, Puli Varudhu, Aattanayagann
 DeVotchKa (formed 1997)Little Miss Sunshine
 Frédéric Devreese (1929–2020)Het Sacrament, Du bout des lèvres, La partie d'échecs
 Sussan Deyhim (born 1958)''Turbulent, Rapture, Mahdokht
 James Di Pasquale (born 1941)McClain's Law, Armed and Dangerous, Rad
 Neil Diamond (born 1941)Jonathan Livingston Seagull, The Jazz Singer
 Michelle DiBucci (born 1961)''Wendigo, Creepshow, Carrier
 Vince DiCola (born 1957)The Transformers: The Movie, Staying Alive, Rocky IV
 Enrique Santos Discépolo (1901–1951)Melodías porteñas, La vida es un tango, En la luz de una estrella 
 Ramin Djawadi (born 1974)Prison Break, Iron Man, Game of Thrones
 Lucia Dlugoszewski (1931–2000)Guns of the Trees, Visual Variations on Noguchi
 Julius Dobos (born 1976)Europe Express, Thend, Black Strawberries
 Robert E. Dolan (1908–1972)Once Upon a Honeymoon, The Great Gatsby, The Man Who Understood Women
 Thomas Dolby (born 1958)Howard the Duck, Gothic, The Gate to the Mind's Eye 
 Klaus Doldinger (born 1936)Das Boot, The NeverEnding Story, Negresco – Eine tödliche Affäre
 Pino Donaggio (born 1941)Don't Look Now, Carrie, Dressed to Kill
 Walter Donaldson (1893–1947)Glorifying the American Girl, The Great Ziegfeld, Panama Hattie
 James Dooley (born 1976)When a Stranger Calls, SOCOM U.S. Navy SEALs: Combined Assault, Infamous
 Steve Dorff (born 1949)Spenser: For Hire, Murphy Brown, Just the Ten of Us
 Pierre van Dormael (1952–2008)Toto the Hero, The Eighth Day, Mr. Nobody
 Paul Doucette (born 1972)Shredderman Rules, Just Pray
 Joel DouekShark Week, Discovery Atlas, The Wildest Dream
 Patrick Doyle (born 1953)Henry V, Hamlet, Sense and Sensibility, Frankenstein
 Carmen Dragon (1914–1984)At Gunpoint, Night into Tomorrow, Invasion of the Body Snatchers
 Christopher DrakeHellboy: Sword of Storms, Batman: Gotham Knight, Justice League: Doom
 Robert Drasnin (1927–2015)Joe Forrester, CHiPs, Cinemania
 Jojo DravenHell Asylum, Witches of the Caribbean, Ghost Month
 Dennis Dreith (born 1948)Purple People Eater, The Punisher, Gag
 Mark Dresser (born 1952)new music for the silent films The Cabinet of Dr. Caligari, Un Chien Andalou
 Jorge Drexler (born 1964)Retrato de mujer con hombre al fondo, Hermanas, The City of Your Final Destination
 George Dreyfus (born 1928)A Steam Train Passes, Rush, The Fringe Dwellers
 Howard Drossin (born 1970)Tom-Yum-Goong, The Man with the Iron Fists, Splatterhouse
 Jack Curtis DubowskyUnder One Roof, Redwoods, Rock Haven
 John Du Prez (born 1946)Monty Python's The Meaning of Life, Oxford Blues, A Fish Called Wanda
 Anne Dudley (born 1956)American History X, The Crying Game, The Full Monty
 Antoine Duhamel (1925–2014)Pierrot le Fou, Week End
 Charles Dumont (born 1929)Les gourmandines, Trafic, Le commando des chauds lapins
 Isaak Dunayevsky (1900–1955)Circus, Jolly Fellows, Volga-Volga
 Maksim Dunayevsky (born 1945)d'Artagnan and Three Musketeers, Mary Poppins, Goodbye, The Witches Cave
 Clay DuncanBlade: The Series, The Grid, Fetch
 Robert DuncanBuffy the Vampire Slayer, Lie to Me, Castle
 Trevor Duncan (1924–2005)Little Red Monkey, The Long Haul
 George Duning (1908–2000)From Here to Eternity, The Devil at 4 O'Clock, Me and the Colonel
 The Dust Brothers (formed 1985)Fight Club
 Jacques Dutronc (born 1943), Van Gogh
 Frank Duval (born 1940)Derrick, The Old Fox, Unsere schönsten Jahre
 Jeff van Dyck (born 1969)Rome: Total War, The Need for Speed, Sled Storm
 Jordan Dykstra (born 1985)Blow the Man Down, Frontline
 Kiril DžajkovskiDust, The Great Water, Bal-Can-Can
 Dado Dzihan (born 1964)Well Tempered Corpses, Sitting Ducks, Breaking and Entering

E 

 Brian Easdale (1909–1995)Black Narcissus, The Red Shoes, Peeping Tom
 Clint Eastwood (born 1930)Mystic River, Million Dollar Baby, Flags of Our Fathers
 Kyle Eastwood (born 1968)Letters from Iwo Jima, Gran Torino, Invictus
 Alex Ebert (born 1978)All Is Lost, A Most Violent Year
 Nicolas Economou (1953–1993)Marianne and Juliane, Unerreichbare Nähe, Rosa Luxemburg
 Randy Edelman (born 1947)Dragon: The Bruce Lee Story, The Mask, Dragonheart, MacGyver, Ryan's Four, The Adventures of Brisco County Jr.
 Greg EdmonsonKing of the Hill, Firefly, Uncharted
 Carl Edouarde (1876–1932)Kismet, The Hunchback of Notre Dame, The Private Life of Helen of Troy
 Ross Edwards (born 1943)Phobia, Eternity, Paradise Road
 Jon Ehrlich (born 1950)
 Stefan EichingerSchätze der Welt – Erbe der Menschheit, Jeder Wind hat seine Reise, Drei Wege nach Samarkand
 Philippe Eidel (1956–2018)Conte d'été, Un air de famille, Kadosh
 Cliff Eidelman (born 1964)Star Trek VI: The Undiscovered Country, Christopher Columbus: The Discovery, Free Willy 3: The Rescue
 Christian Eigner (born 1971)Blutrausch, Die Viertelliterklasse
 Ludovico Einaudi (born 1955)Fuori Dal Mondo, This Is England, The Intouchables
 F. M. Einheit (born 1958)Der Platz, Im Platz, Der Tag
 Richard Einhorn (born 1952)The Prowler, Sister, Sister, The Passion of Joan of Arc
 Einstürzende Neubauten (formed 1980)Berlin Babylon
 Der EisenrostTokyo Fist, Bullet Ballet, Gemini
 Hanns Eisler (1898–1962)Night and Fog, The Woman on the Beach
 Element of Crime (formed 1985)Robert Zimmermann wundert sich über die Liebe
 Danny Elfman (born 1953)Batman, Edward Scissorhands, The Nightmare Before Christmas, Spider-Man, Milk,  Fifty Shades of Grey 
 Jonathan Elias (born 1956)Children of the Corn, Two Moon Junction, Pathfinder
 Rachel Elkind-Tourre (born 1939)The Shining
 Boris ElkisA Perfect Getaway, Bugged!, Streetwise
 Duke Ellington (1899–1974)Anatomy of a Murder, Paris Blues, Change of Mind
 Dean Elliott (1925–1999)Fantastic Four, Fangface, Alvin and the Chipmunks
 Jack Elliott (1927–2001)The Comic, Support Your Local Gunfighter, The Jerk
 Don Ellis (1934–1978)Moon Zero Two, The French Connection, The Seven-Ups, French Connection II
 Ray Ellis (1923–2008)
 Warren Ellis (born 1965)The Proposition, The Assassination of Jesse James by the Coward Robert Ford, The Road
 Albert Elms (1920–2009)Man in a Suitcase, The Prisoner, The Champions
 Keith Emerson (1944–2016)Inferno, Nighthawks, Murder Rock
 Jon English (1949–2016)Against the Wind, Touch and Go
 Tobias EnhusThe Matrix: Path of Neo, Spider-Man 3
 Jeremy Enigk (born 1974)Dream With The Fishes, The United States of Leland
 Brian Eno (born 1948)The Lovely Bones, Sebastiane, For All Mankind
 Roger Eno (born 1959)For All Mankind
 Enya (born 1961)The Frog Prince, The Celts
 Nicolas Errèra (born 1967)Shaolin (film), The White Storm, XIII: The Conspiracy, The Butterfly (2002 film), Au nom de ma fille, Mountain Cry
 Harry Escott (born 1976)Hard Candy, The Road to Guantanamo, Shame
 Ilan Eshkeri (born 1977)Layer Cake, Ninja Assassin, Coriolanus
 Juan García Esquivel (1928–2002)Aventuras de Cucuruchito y Pinocho, Locura pasional, The Tall Man
 Ray Evans (1915–2007)Mister Ed, Tammy, Bonanza
 Sebastian Evans
 Explosions in the Sky (formed 1999)Prince Avalanche

F 

 Adam F (born 1972)Ali G Indahouse
 Bent Fabric (1924–2020)The Poet and the Little Mother, Death Comes at High Noon, Klown
 Asser Fagerström (1912–1990)Vastuu, People Not as Bad as They Seem
 Brian Fahey (1919–2007)Curse of Simba, The Plank, Rhubarb
 Uwe Fahrenkrog-Petersen (born 1960)All the Queen's Men, Igby Goes Down, Globi und der Schattenräuber
 Sammy Fain (1902–1989)Peter Pan, Calamity Jane, Love Is a Many-Splendored Thing
 Percy Faith (1908–1976)Tammy Tell Me True, The Virginian, The Oscar
 Nima Fakhrara (born 1983)Broadway Bound, The Courier, Gatchaman
 Harold Faltermeyer (born 1952)Top Gun, Beverly Hills Cop, Tango & Cash
 David Fanshawe (1942–2010)When the Boat Comes In, The Feathered Serpent, Flambards
 Robert Farnon (1917–2005)Maytime in Mayfair, Captain Horatio Hornblower R.N., It's a Wonderful World
 Kurt Farquhar The King of Queens, Moesha, Sister, Sister, The Game, Black Lightning, Being Mary Jane, Girlfriends, Soul Food: The Series, Ned & Stacey
 Paul Farrer (born 1973)Weakest Link, Dancing on Ice, The Krypton Factor
 Toufic Farroukh Ana El Awan, Phantom Beirut, Women Beyond Borders
 Barry Fasman
 Bruce FaulconerDragon Ball Z, Your House and Home, Bass Champs
 Jeffrey FaymanOpen Water, co-founder and composer of Immediate Music
 Louis Febre (born 1959)
 Morton Feldman (1926–1987)
 Eric Fenby (1906–1997)Jamaica Inn, Song of Summer
 George Fenton (born 1950)Gandhi, The Company of Wolves, The Fisher King, Groundhog Day
 Allyn Ferguson (1924–2010)Barney Miller, Charlie's Angels, The Last Days of Patton
 Jay Ferguson (born 1947)A Nightmare on Elm Street 5: The Dream Child, NCIS: Los Angeles, The Office
 Lorenzo Ferrero (born 1951)Anemia
 Paul Ferris (1941–1995)The Blood Beast Terror, Witchfinder General, The Creeping Flesh
 Nico Fidenco (born 1933)Emanuelle nera, La via della prostituzione, Zombi Holocaust
 Brad Fiedel (born 1951)The Terminator, The Running Man, Red Heat, Total Recall, Terminator 2: Judgment Day, True Lies, Midnight Caller, Reasonable Doubts
 Jerry Fielding (1922–1980)The Nightcomers, The Bad News Bears, Demon Seed
 Magnus Fiennes (born 1965)Murphy's Law, Hustle, Death in Paradise
 Mike Figgis (born 1948)Leaving Las Vegas, One Night Stand, Timecode
 Chad Fischer (born 1976)
 Eveline Fischer (born 1969)Donkey Kong Country, Donkey Kong Country 3: Dixie Kong's Double Trouble!
 Luboš Fišer (1935–1999)Valerie and Her Week of Wonders, Oxen, Kral Ubu
 Peter Fish (1956–2021)
 Frank Fitzpatrick (born 1961)
 Stephen Flaherty (born 1960)
 Tom Flannery (born 1966)
 Maurice Fleuret (1932–1990)
 Flo & Eddie (formed 1965)
 Flying Lotus (born 1983)Kuso, Blade Runner Black Out 2022, Perfect
 Adrian Foley, 8th Baron Foley (1923–2012)
 Tim Follin (born 1970)
 Ari Folman (born 1962)
 Robert Folk (born 1949)Ace Ventura When Nature Calls, There Be Dragons, Toy Soldiers, Police Academy
 Troels Brun Folmann (born 1974)
 Keith Forsey (born 1948)
 Bruce Fowler (born 1947)
 Charles Fox (born 1940)
 Francis and the LightsRobot & Frank
 Jesús Franco (1930–2013)
 Massimiliano Frani (born 1967)
 David Michael Frank (born 1948)
 Christopher Franke (born 1953)Babylon 5, Universal Soldier, What the Bleep Do We Know!?
 Benjamin Frankel (1906–1973)
 Jason Frederick (born 1970)
 Jesse Frederick (born 1948)Full House, Family Matters, Step by Step, Perfect Strangers, Better Days, Family Man
 Ian Freebairn-Smith (born 1932)
 Freur (1982–1986)
 Gerald Fried (1928-2023)Star Trek: The Original Series, Roots, Mr. Terrific, Flamingo Road, It's About Time
 Hugo Friedhofer (1901–1981)
 Bill Frisell (born 1951)
 Fred Frith (born 1949)
 Jürgen Fritz (born 1953)Eine Frau für gewisse Stunden, Hard to Be a God
 John Frizzell (born 1966)I Still Know What You Did Last Summer, Ghost Ship, Whiteout, Legion, The Loft
 Fabio Frizzi (born 1951)
 Edgar Froese (1944–2015)
 Front Line Assembly (formed 1986)Quake III Arena
 Dominic Frontiere (1931–2017)Hang 'Em High, Chisum, The Train Robbers, The Stunt Man, The Aviator, The Immortal, The Invaders, Matt Houston, Vega$
 Ben Frost (born 1980)Sleeping Beauty, In Her Skin, Rokland
 Hideyuki Fukasawa (born 1970)
 Nathan Furst (born 1978)
 Giovanni Fusco (1906–1968)

G 

 Reeves Gabrels (born 1956)
 George Gabriel (born 1971)
 Peter Gabriel (born 1950)Birdy, The Last Temptation of Christ, Rabbit-Proof Fence
 Serge Gainsbourg (1928–1991)
 Vincent Gallo (born 1961)
 Martin Galway (born 1966)
 Douglas Gamley (1924–1998)
 Jeet Ganguly (born 1977)
 Gara Garayev (1918–1982)
 Anja Garbarek (born 1970)
 Jan Garbarek (born 1947)
 Antón García Abril (1933–2021)Tombs of the Blind Dead, Los santos inocentes
 Russell Garcia (1916–2011)
 Stu Gardner
 Dan Gardopée 
 Garish (formed 1997)
 Snuff Garrett (1938–2015)
 Mort Garson (1924–2008)
 Georges Garvarentz (1932–1993)
 Giorgio Gaslini (1929–2014)La Notte, Deep Red
 Tony Gatlif (born 1948)Vengo, Transylvania, Gadjo dilo
 Mohammed Gauss
 Marvin Gaye (1939–1984)Trouble Man
 Ron Geesin (born 1943)
 Grant Geissman (born 1953)
 James Gelfand (born 1959)
 Ivan Georgiev (born 1966)S&M Judge
 Lisa Gerrard (born 1961)
 Matthew Gerrard
 George Gershwin (1898–1937)
 Irving Gertz (1915–2008)
 Stephen Geyer (born 1950)
 Ghantasala (1922–1974)
 Michael Giacchino (born 1967)The Incredibles, The Family Stone, Mission: Impossible III and Ghost Protocol, Ratatouille, Up, Star Trek, Into Darkness and Beyond, Land of the Lost, Cars 2, Dawn of the Planet of the Apes and War for the Planet of the Apes, Jurassic World, Fallen Kingdom and Dominion, Inside Out, Zootopia, Doctor Strange, Spider-Man: Homecoming, Far from Home and No Way Home, Coco, Extinct, The Batman, Lightyear, Thor: Love and Thunder
 Michael Gibbs (born 1937)
 Richard Gibbs (born 1955)
 Herschel Burke Gilbert (1918–2003)
 Gary Gilbertson
 Alan Gill
 Terry Gilkyson (1916–1999)
 Norman Gimbel (1925–2018)
 Alberto Ginastera (1916–1983)
 Daniel Giorgetti (born 1971)
 Paul Giovanni (1933–1990)The Wicker Man
 Girls Against Boys (formed 1988)Series 7: The Contenders
 Lutz Glandien (born 1954)
 Scott Glasgow
 Paul Glass (born 1934)
 Philip Glass (born 1937)Koyaanisqatsi, The Hours, Candyman, Powaqqatsi
 Albert Glasser (1916–1998)
 Jason Gleed
 Patrick Gleeson (born 1934)
 Evelyn Glennie (born 1965)
 Nick Glennie-Smith (born 1951)
 Goblin
 Vladimír Godár (born 1956)
 Godiego (formed 1975)Monkey, Ganbaron, Galaxy Express 999
 Lucio Godoy (born 1958)
 Ramana Gogula
 Matthias Gohl
 Ernest Gold (1921–1999)Exodus 
 Murray Gold (born 1969)
 Barry Goldberg (born 1942)
 Billy Goldenberg (1936–2020)
 Elliot Goldenthal (born 1954)Interview with the Vampire, Alien 3, Frida, Heat, Final Fantasy: The Spirits Within
 Alison Goldfrapp (born 1966)My Summer of Love, Nowhere Boy
 Jean-Jacques Goldman (born 1951)
 Bobby Goldsboro (born 1941)
 Jerry Goldsmith (1929–2004)Planet of the Apes, Patton, The Omen, Alien, Star Trek: The Motion Picture, Total Recall, Basic Instinct
 Joel Goldsmith (1957–2012)
 Jonathan Goldsmith
 Alexander Goldstein (born 1948)Orange Winter, Storm Over Asia, Vasya, The Case of the Three Million
 Osvaldo Golijov (born 1960)Youth Without Youth, Tetro, 11'09"01 September 11
 Benny Golson (born 1929)
 Alejandro González Iñárritu (born 1963)
 Miles Goodman (1948–1996)
 Gordon Goodwin (born 1954)
 Ron Goodwin (1925–2003)
 Alain Goraguer (1931-2023)
 Ludwig Göransson (born 1984)Black Panther, The Mandalorian
 Michael Gordon (born 1956)
 Paul Gordon (1963–2016)
 Michael Gore (born 1951)
 Adam Gorgoni (born 1963)
 Manami Gotoh (born 1964)
 Louis F. Gottschalk (1864–1934)
 Glenn Gould (1932–1982)
 Morton Gould (1913–1996)
 Patrick Gowers (1936–2014)
 Desirée Goyette (born 1956)
 Paul Grabowsky (born 1958)
 Ron Grainer (1922–1981)
 Jason Graves
 Allan Gray (1902–1973)
 Barry Gray (1908–1984)
 Clifford Grey (1887–1941)
 Gavin Greenaway (born 1964)
 Johnny Green (1908–1989)
 Theo Green
 Walter Greene (1910–1983)
 Howard Greenfield (1936–1986)
 Jonny Greenwood (born 1971)Bodysong, There Will Be Blood, Norwegian Wood
 Gustaf Grefberg (born 1974)
 Will Gregory (born 1959)My Summer of Love, Nowhere Boy
 Harry Gregson-Williams (born 1961)Antz, Chicken Run, Shrek, Sinbad: Legend of the Seven Seas, Flushed Away, The Martian, The Last Duel
 Rupert Gregson-Williams (born 1966)Over the Hedge, Bee Movie, Abominable, Grown Ups 1 and 2, Wonder Women, Aquaman and the Lost Kingdom
 Merv Griffin (1925–2007)
 Mark Griskey (born 1963)
 Raymond van het Groenewoud (born 1950)
 Launy Grøndahl (1886–1960)
 Herbert Grönemeyer (born 1956)
 Charles Gross (born 1934)
 Jacob Groth (born 1951)
 Louis Gruenberg (1884–1964)Quicksand, Commandos Strike at Dawn, All the King's Men
 Larry Groupé (born 1957)The Contender, The Outpost, Nothing But the Truth, Straw Dogs
 Dave Grusin (born 1934)
 Jay Gruska (born 1952)
 Sofia Gubaidulina (born 1931)
 James William Guercio (born 1945)Electra Glide in Blue
 Jean-Pierre Guiran (born 1950)
 Fuat Güner (born 1948)
 Christopher Gunning (born 1944)
 Hildur Guðnadóttir (born 1982)Joker, Chernobyl (TV Mini-Series)
 Gurukiran
 Olof Gustafsson
 Sven Gyldmark (1904–1981)

H 

 Bárður Háberg (born 1979)
 Alexander Hacke (born 1965)Das Wilde Leben, Head-On, 
 Manos Hadjidakis (1925–1994)
 Georg Haentzschel (1907–1992)
 Richard Hageman (1881–1966)
 Earle Hagen (1919–2008)
 Peter Hajba (born 1974)
 Haim
 Uzeyir Hajibeyov (1885–1948) 
 Darko Hajsek (born 1959)Madonna (1999 film)
 Taro Hakase (born 1968)
 Halfdan E (born 1965)
 Dick Halligan (1943–2022)
 Shirō Hamaguchi (born 1969)
 Chico Hamilton (1921–2013)
 Marvin Hamlisch (1944–2012)
 Chuck Hammer 
 Jan Hammer (born 1948)
 Oscar Hammerstein II (1885–1960)
 Hamsalekha (born 1951)
 Herbie Hancock (born 1940)
 Frederic Hand (born 1947)
 Kentarō Haneda (1949–2007)
 James Hannigan (born 1971)
 Ilmari Hannikainen (1892–1955) 
 Glen Hansard (born 1970)
 Raymond Hanson (1913–1976)
 Petr Hapka (1944–2014)
 Edward W. Hardy (born 1992) The Woodsman
 Hagood Hardy (1937–1997)
 Jon Hare (born 1966)
 Kurt Harland (born 1963)
 Leigh Harline (1907–1969)
 Barry Harman (born 1952)
 Joe Harnell (1924–2005) The Incredible Hulk (1978 TV series), Santa Barbara (TV series)
 Don L. Harper
 Albert Harris (1916–2005)
 Johnny Harris (1932–2020)
 Sue Harris
 John Harrison (born 1948)
 Jimmy Harry
 Jimmy Hart (born 1943)
 Hal Hartley (born 1959)
 Richard Hartley (born 1944)
 Paul Hartnoll (born 1968)
 Mick Harvey (born 1958)
 Richard Harvey (born 1953)
 Bo Harwood (1946–2022)
 Tomoki Hasegawa (born 1957)
 Ichiko Hashimoto (born 1952)
 Paul Haslinger (born 1962)
 Aki Hata (born 1966)
 Tony Hatch (born 1939)
 Donny Hathaway (1945–1979)
 Marvin Hatley (1905–1986)
 Katsuhisa Hattori (1936–2020)
 M. Maurice Hawkesworth (born 1960)
 Alan Hawkshaw (1937–2021)
 Fumio Hayasaka (1914–1955)
 Hikaru Hayashi (1931–2012)Death by Hanging
 Pete Haycock (1951–2013)One False Move
 Isaac Hayes (1942–2008)
 Jack Hayes (1911–2011)
 Lennie Hayton (1908–1971)
 Richard Hazard (1921–2000)
 Michael Hearst (born 1972)
 Neal Hefti (1922–2008)
 Reinhold Heil (born 1954)
 Zack Hemsey (born 1983)
 Michael Hennagin (1936–1993)
 Joe Henry (born 1960)
 Hans Werner Henze (1926–2012)
 Paul Hepker (born 1967)
 Victor Herbert (1859–1924)
 Michel Herr (born 1949)
 Bernard Herrmann (1911–1975)Psycho, North by Northwest, Vertigo, Citizen Kane, Taxi Driver
 Paul HertzogBloodsport, Kickboxer
 David Hess (1936–2011)
 Nigel Hess (born 1953)
 Eric Hester (born 1974)
 Andrew Hewitt (born 1976)
 David Hewson (born 1953)
 Nick Hexum (born 1971)
 Miki Higashino (born 1968)
 Nat Hiken (1914–1968)
 Hilmar Örn Hilmarsson (born 1958)
 Stephen Hilton (born 1974)
 Paul Hindemith (1895–1963)
 Yoshihisa Hirano (born 1971)
 Susumu Hirasawa (born 1954)
 David Hirschfelder (born 1960)
 Joel Hirschhorn (1937–2005)
 Joe Hisaishi (born 1950)
 Alun Hoddinott (1929–2008)Sword of Sherwood Forest
 Derrick Hodge (born 1979)
 Michael Hoenig (born 1952)
 Bernard Hoffer (born 1934)
 Robin Hoffmann (born 1984)
 Friedrich Hollaender (1896–1976)
 Dulcie Holland (1913–2000)
 David Holmes (born 1969)
 Rupert Holmes (born 1947)
 Bo Holten (born 1948)The Element of Crime
 Arthur Honegger (1892–1955) 
 Honk (formed 1970)Five Summer Stories
 Hannu Honkonen (born 1982)
 Johan Hoogewijs (born 1957)
 Les Hooper (born 1940)
 Nicholas Hooper (born 1952) Harry Potter and the Order of the Phoenix, Harry Potter and the Half-Blood Prince, Land of the Tiger
 Nellee Hooper (born 1963)
 Ciaran Hope (born 1974) The Letters, Truth About Kerry
 Anthony Hopkins (born 1937)August, Slipstream, Dylan Thomas: Return Journey
 Antony Hopkins (1921–2014)
 Jon Hopkins (born 1979)
 Kenyon Hopkins (1912–1983)
 Steve Hopkins
 Hal Hopper (1912–1970)
 Keith Hopwood (born 1946)
 Trevor Horn (born 1949)
 James Horner (1953–2015)Aliens, Braveheart, Avatar, The Land Before Time, Titanic, The Amazing Spider-Man 
 André Hossein (1905–1983)
 Tomoyasu Hotei (born 1962)Fear and Loathing in Las Vegas, Samurai Fiction
 James Newton Howard (born 1951)The Sixth Sense, Unbreakable, The Village, Lady in the Water, The Dark Knight
 Ken Howard (born 1939)
 Alan Howarth (born 1948)
 Tom Howe (born 1977)
 Peter Howell (born 1949)
 Nihad Hrustanbegovic (born 1973)
 Rob Hubbard (born 1955)Master of Magic, Commando, Auf Wiedersehen Monty
 L. Ron Hubbard (1911–1986)The Case He Couldn't Crack, The Problem of Life, What Happened to These Civilizations?
 Robert Hughes (1912–2007)
 Chris Hülsbeck (born 1968)
 Scott Humphrey
 Andy Hunter (born 1974)
 Gottfried Huppertz (1887–1937)Metropolis, Die Nibelungen, The Green Domino
 Craig Huxley (born 1954)
 Søren Hyldgaard (1962–2018)
 Dick Hyman (born 1927)

I 

 Jacques Ibert (1890–1962)Don Quixote, Golgotha, Macbeth, Conflit
 Abdullah Ibrahim (born 1934)Chocolat, No Fear, No Die
 Toshi Ichiyanagi (born 1933)Eros Plus Massacre
 Akira Ifukube (1914–2006)Godzilla, Ghidorah, the Three-Headed Monster, Destroy All Monsters, Space Amoeba
 Alberto Iglesias (born 1955)All About My Mother, The Kite Runner, The Constant Gardener
 Ilaiyaraaja (born 1943)Thalapathi, Nayakan, Nizhalkuthu and scored for more than 1000 films
 Jerrold Immel (born 1936)Dallas, How the West Was Won, Voyagers!, Knots Landing
 In the Nursery (formed 1981)new music for the silent films The Cabinet of Dr. Caligari, Man with a Movie Camera, Asphalt
 Daniel Ingram (born 1975)My Little Pony: Friendship Is Magic, Pound Puppies, Martha Speaks
 Neil Innes (1944–2019)Monty Python's Flying Circus, Monty Python and the Holy Grail, All You Need Is Cash, Erik the Viking
 Damon Intrabartolo (born 1975)The Journey of Jared Price, Navigate this Maze
 John Ireland (1879–1962)The Overlanders
 Markéta Irglová (born 1988)Once
 Pat Irwin (born 1955)Rocko's Modern Life, Loose Women, Class of 3000
 Mark Isham (born 1951)Of Mice and Men, The Cooler, Blade, Crash
 Chu Ishikawa (1966–2017)Tetsuo: The Iron Man, Gemini, A Snake of June
 Emir Işılay (born 1978)Murder on Pleasant Drive, Summerland
 Robert Israel (born 1963)numerous silent film scores 
 Masumi ItōAngel Sanctuary, éX-Driver, Galaxy Angel
 Teiji Ito (1935–1982)Meshes of the Afternoon, The Very Eye of Night, Maeva
 Peter Ivers (1946–1983)Eraserhead, Grand Theft Auto, B. J. and the Bear
 Taku Iwasaki (born 1968)Origin: Spirits of the Past, Uncharted Waters Online, Onimusha
 Taro Iwashiro (born 1965)Red Cliff, Memories of Murder
 Masaharu Iwata (born 1966)Ogre Battle: The March of the Black Queen, Tactics Ogre: Let Us Cling Together, Final Fantasy Tactics

J 

 Steve Jablonsky (born 1970)Transformers, The Island, Steamboy
 Henry Jackman (born 1974)  Captain America: The Winter Soldier, Captain America: Civil War, Kong: Skull Island, Uncharted 4: A Thief's End
 Danny Jacob (born 1956)
 Richard Jacques (born 1973) 
 Óli Jógvansson (born 1969)
 Mick Jagger (born 1943)Invocation of My Demon Brother, Alfie
 Jaidev (1918–1987)
 Shankar Jaikishan
 Ravindra Jain (1944–2015)
 Bob James (born 1939)Taxi, Daniel
 Malek Jandali (born 1972) 
 Chas Jankel (born 1952)
 Enzo Jannacci (1935–2013)Seven Beauties
 Werner Janssen (1899–1990)
 Jean-Michel Jarre (born 1948)
 Maurice Jarre (1924–2009)Lawrence of Arabia, Doctor Zhivago, Topaz, Dead Poets Society
 Michael Jary (1906–1988)
 Maurice Jaubert (1900–1940)
 Harris Jayaraj (born 1975)
 Wyclef Jean (born 1969)
 Def Jef (born 1970)
 Karl Jenkins (born 1944)The Celts
 Merrill Jenson (born 1947)
 Zhao Jiping (born 1945)
 Jo Yeong-wook (born 1962)
 Antonio Carlos Jobim (Tom Jobim) (1927–1994)
 Eddie Jobson (born 1955)
 Adan Jodorowsky (born 1979)Echek, Teou
 Alejandro Jodorowsky (born 1929)El Topo, The Holy Mountain
 Barði Jóhannsson (born 1975)Reykjavík-Rotterdam, Fíaskó, new music for the silent film Häxan
 Óli Jógvansson (born 1969)
 Jóhann Jóhannsson (1969–2018)
 Elton John (born 1947)
 Johnson (1953–2011)
 J. J. Johnson (1924–2001)
 Laurie Johnson (born 1927)
 Nathan Johnson (born 1976)
 Adrian Johnston (born 1961)
 Arthur Johnston (1898–1954)
 Bobby Johnston (born 1967)
 Jim Johnston (born 1952)
 Brian Jones (1942–1969)
 Dan Jones 
 John Paul Jones (born 1946)
 Quincy Jones (born 1933)In Cold Blood, In the Heat of the Night, The Color Purple, Roots
 Quincy Jones III (born 1968)
 Raymond Jones
 Ron Jones (born 1954)
 Tim Jones (born 1971)The Forsaken, Chuck, Karla
 Trevor Jones (born 1949)The Dark Crystal, Dark City, Mississippi Burning, The Last of the Mohicans
 Vincent JonesParks and Recreation
 Jónsi (born 1975)
 Lakshman Joseph de SaramBel Ami, Between Two Worlds
 Peter Joseph (born 1979)
 Richard Joseph (1953–2007)
 Michael Josephs (born 1959)
 Wilfred Josephs (1927–1997)
 Paul K. Joyce (born 1957)
 Laurence Juber (born 1952)
 Jude (born 1969)
 Don Julian (1937–1998)Savage!, Shorty the Pimp
 Joseph Julian Gonzalez
 David Julyan (born 1967)Memento, The Descent, The Prestige
 Junkie XL (born 1967)DOA: Dead or Alive, SSX Blur, Need for Speed: ProStreet
 Walter Jurmann (1903–1971)
 Patrick Juvet (1950–2021)

K 

 John Erik Kaada (born 1975)O' Horten, Natural Born Star
 Dmitri Kabalevsky (1904–1987)
 Jan A.P. Kaczmarek (born 1953)
 Mauricio Kagel (1931–2008)
 Gus Kahn (1886–1941)
 Akari Kaida (born 1974)
 Yuki Kajiura (born 1965)
 Paul Kalkbrenner (born 1977)
 George Kallis (born 1974)
 Bert Kalmar (1884–1947)
 Peter Kam
 Michael Kamen (1948–2003) Robin Hood: Prince of Thieves, Don Juan Demarco, Mr. Holland's Opus, License To Kill
 John Kander (born 1927)
 Artie Kane (1929–2022)
 Shigeru Kan-no (born 1959)
 Noam Kaniel (born 1962)Power Rangers, Glitter Force, Digimon Fusion
 Yoko Kanno (born 1963)Cowboy Bebop, Darker than Black, Macross Plus, Turn A Gundam, The Vision of Escaflowne, Ghost in the Shell: Stand Alone Complex, Wolf's Rain, Kids on the Slope, Terror in Resonance
 Yugo Kanno (born 1977) – JoJo's Bizarre Adventure: seasons 2, 3, and 4, Batman Ninja
 Tuomas Kantelinen (born 1969)
 Bronisław Kaper (1902–1983)
 Sol Kaplan (1919–1990)
 Eleni Karaindrou (born 1941)
 Nele Karajlić (born 1962)
 Anton Karas (1906–1985)
 Fred Karlin (1936–2004)
 Laura Karpman (born 1959)
 Kent Karlsson (born 1945)
 Al Kasha (1937–2020)
 Peter Kater (born 1958)
 Emilio Kauderer
 Jake Kaufman (born 1981)
 John Kavanaugh
 Kenji Kawai (born 1957)
 Arthur Kay (1881–1969)
 Norman Kay (1929–2001)
 Eric Kaz (born 1946)Greetings, Hi, Mom!
 Dave Koz
 Yakov Kazyansky (born 1948)
 Brian Keane (born 1953)
 John E. Keane (born 1952)
 John M. Keane (born 1965)
 Tom Keenlyside (born 1950)Mega Man, Monster Rancher, Dragon Ball Z
 M. M. Keeravani (born 1961)
 Roger Kellaway (born 1939)
 Jack Keller (1938–2005)
 Paul Kelly (born 1955)
 Victoria Kelly – Fracture, The Ugly, Black Sheep
 Rolfe Kent (born 1963)
 Walter Kent (1911–1994)
 Jerome Kern (1885–1945)
 Premasiri Kernadasa (1937–2008)
 Aram Khachaturian (1903–1978)
 Khaled (born 1960)
 Aashish Khan (born 1939)
 Ali Akbar Khan (1922–2009)
 Praga Khan (born 1959)
 Usha Khanna (born 1941)
 Yuri Khanon (born 1965)European Film Awards-1988: Days of Eclipse, Save and Preserve
 Alex Khaskin (born 1961)
 Mohammed Zahur Khayyam (1927–2019)
 Tikhon Khrennikov (1913–2007)
 Khawaja Khurshid Anwar (1912–1984)
 Shunsuke Kikuchi (1931–2021)Dragon Ball Z
 Wojciech Kilar (1932–2013)
 Kevin Kiner (born 1958)
 Alastair King (born 1967)
 John King
 Kaki King (born 1979)
 Gershon Kingsley (1922–2019)
 Basil Kirchin (1927–2005)
 Gökhan Kırdar (born 1970)
 Grant Kirkhope (born 1962)
 Martin Kiszko (born 1958)
 Kitarō (born 1953)
 David Kitay (born 1961)
 Johnny Klimek (born 1962)
 Jan Klusák (born 1934)
 David Knopfler (born 1952)
 Mark Knopfler (born 1949)The Princess Bride
 Leon Ko
 Erland von Koch (1910–2009)Kris, It Rains on Our Love, Girl with Hyacinths
 Konstancja Kochaniec (born 1976)
 Krzysztof Komeda (1931–1969)The Fearless Vampire Killers, Rosemary's Baby, Knife in the Water, Cul-de-sac
 Koji Kondo (born 1961)Mario, The Legend of Zelda, Star Fox 64
 Robbie Kondor
 Joseph Koo (1931-2023)
 Al Kooper (born 1944)
 Ben Kopec (born 1981)
 Hermann Kopp (born 1954)Nekromantik, Der Todesking, Nekromantik 2
 Rudolph G. Kopp (1887–1974)Sign of the Cross, Cleopatra (DeMille 1934), The Crusades.
 Anders Koppel (born 1947)
 Erich Wolfgang Korngold (1897–1957)Anthony Adverse, The Adventures of Robin Hood
 Danny Kortchmar (born 1946)
 Mark KorvenI've Heard the Mermaids Singing, Cube, A Scattering of Seeds
 Richard Kosinski
 Joseph Kosma (1905–1969)
 Irwin Kostal (1911–1994)The Sound of Music, Mary Poppins, Fantasia (1982 digital re-recording)
 Robert Kraft
 William Kraft (1923–2022)
 Robert J. Kral (born 1967)
 Wayne Kramer (born 1948)
 Raoul Kraushaar (1908–2001)
 John Henry Kreitler
 K. M. Radha Krishnan
 David Kristian (born 1967)
 Mina Kubota (born 1972)
 Vivian Kubrick (born 1960)
 Taro Kudou
 G. V. Prakash Kumar (born 1987)
 Gary Kuo
 Meyer Kupferman (1926–2003)
 David Kurtz
 Emir Kusturica (born 1954)
 Keisuke Kuwata (born 1956)
 Chan Kwong-Wing (born 1967)
 Jesper Kyd (born 1972)
 Milan Kymlicka (1936–2008)

L 

 John T. La BarberaPane Amaro, What's Up Scarlet?, Children of Fate: Life and Death in a Sicilian Family
 Fariborz Lachini (born 1949)
 Thorsten Laewe
 Bappi Lahiri (born 1952)
 Francis Lai (1932–2018)Love Story, Bilitis, A Man and a Woman
 Laibach (formed 1980)Iron Sky
 Nick Laird-Clowes (born 1957)
 Constant Lambert (1905–1951)
 Russ Landau Survivor
 Marcel Landowski (1915–1999)
 Jim Lang (born 1950)Hey Arnold!: The Movie
 Bruce Langhorne (1938–2017)
 Daniel Lanois (born 1951)
 Laraaji (born 1943)
 Glen A. Larson (1937–2014)
 Nathan Larson (born 1970)
 Richard LaSalle (1918–2015)
 James Last (1929–2015)
 Alexander Laszlo (1895–1975)
 Felice Lattuada (1882–1962)
 Tats Lau (born 1963)
 Ken Lauber (born 1941)
 William Lava (1911–1971)
 Angelo Francesco Lavagnino (1909–1987)
 Tom Lavin
 James Lavino (born 1973)
 Elliot Lawrence (1925–2021)
 Stephen J. Lawrence
 Maury Laws (1923–2019)
 Raam Laxman (born 1942)
 Jean-Marc Lederman
 Lee Byung-woo (born 1965)A Tale of Two Sisters, The Host, Mother 
 Ian LeFeuvre
 Raymond Lefèvre (1929–2008)Le Gendarme de Saint-Tropez, La Soupe aux choux
 Mark Leggett
 Michel Legrand (1932–2019)Cléo from 5 to 7, The Umbrellas of Cherbourg, F for Fake
 Barry Leitch (born 1970)
 Christopher Lennertz (born 1972)Medal of Honor: Rising Sun, Saint Sinner, Alvin and the Chipmunks, Supernatural
 Sean Lennon (born 1975)
 Nicholas Lens (born 1957)
 Stefano Lentini (born 1974)
 Jack Lenz (born 1949)
 Patrick Leonard (born 1956)
 Raymond Leppard (1927–2019)
 Sondre Lerche (born 1982)Dan in Real Life
 Cory Lerios (born 1951)
 César Lerner
 Jérôme Leroy (born 1981)
 Yaacov Bilansky Levanon (1895–1965)
 Sylvester Levay (born 1945)
 Laurent Levesque (born 1970)
 Mica Levi (born 1987)Under the Skin, Jackie, Marjorie Prime, Monos
 Geoff Levin (born 1945)
 Stewart Levin
 James S. Levine (born 1974)
 Michael A. Levine (born 1964)
 Krishna Levy (born 1964)8 Women
 Louis Levy (1894–1957)
 Shuki Levy (born 1947)Inspector Gadget, Digimon Adventure, Spider-Man: The Animated Series, He-Man
 Frank Lewin (1925–2008)
 Herschell Gordon Lewis (1926–2016)
 Dominic Lewis (born 1985)
 Lesle Lewis (born 1960)
 Jan Leyers (born 1958)
 Blake Leyh (born 1962)
 Sven Libaek (born 1938)
 Michael Licari
 Daniel Licht (1957–2017)
 Russell Lieblich (1953–2005)
 Krister Linder (born 1970)
 Hal Lindes (born 1953)
 Mort Lindsey (1923–2012)
 Michael Lira (born 1975)Wyrmwood, Growing Up Smith, The Hunter
 Zdeněk Liška (1922–1983)
 Zülfü Livaneli (born 1946)
 Jay Livingston (1915–2001)
 Andrew Lloyd Webber (born 1948)
 Michael Lloyd (born 1948)
 Lowell Lo (born 1950)
 Los Lobos
 Andrew Lockington (born 1974)
 Didier Lockwood (1956–2018)
 Malcolm Lockyer (1923–1976)
 Joseph LoDuca (born 1958)Xena: Warrior Princess, The Evil Dead, Hercules: The Legendary Journeys, Army of Darkness
 John Loeffler (born 1951)
 Frederick Loewe (1901–1988)
 Henning Lohner (born 1961)
 William Loose (1910–1991)
 Jon Lord (1941–2012)
 Rob Lord (born 1966)
 Saša Lošić (born 1964)
 Alexina Louie (born 1949)
 Louiguy (1916–1991)
 Jacques Loussier (1934–2019)
 Chris Lowe (born 1959)
 David Lowe (born 1959)
 Mundell Lowe (1922–2017)
 Jaye Luckett (born 1974)
 Ralph Lundsten (born 1936)
 Evan Lurie (born 1954)
 John Lurie (born 1952)
 Danny Lux (born 1969)
 David Lynch (born 1946)Eraserhead, Inland Empire, Twin Peaks: Fire Walk with Me
 Liam Lynch (born 1970)

M 

 M83 (formed 2001)Oblivion
 Lebo M (born 1964)The Lion King 1½, Long Night's Journey into Day
 Galt MacDermot
 Teo Macero (1925–2008)Virus, A.k.a. Cassius Clay
 Bruno MadernaLa morte ha fatto l'uovo
 Madonna (born 1958)
 Manoj George 
 Jun Maeda
 Michel Magne
 K. V. Mahadevan
 Shankar Mahadevan
 Taj Mahal
 Vusi Mahlasela
 Jerzy Maksymiuk
 Anu Malik
 Kalyani Malik
 Dmitry Malikov
 Matty Malneck
 Albert Hay Malotte
 Riichiro Manabe
 Josh Mancell (born 1969)
 Mark Mancina (born 1957)
 Henry Mancini (1924–1994)
 Johnny Mandel (1925–2020)
 Christopher Mann
 Roger Joseph Manning, Jr.
 Franco Mannino
 Manohar
 Clint Mansell (born 1963)π, Requiem for a Dream, The Fountain,  Moon,  Black Swan,
 Keith Mansfield (born 1943)
 Marilyn Manson (born 1969)Resident Evil, Splatter Sisters
 Tigran Mansurian (born 1939)The Color of Pomegranates, We and Our Mountains
 Kevin Manthei (born 1970)
 Homero Manzi
 Matthew Margeson (born 1980)
 Dario Marianelli (born 1963)Atonement, V for Vendetta, Agora
 Anthony MarinelliStand by Me, Young Guns, Leaving Las Vegas, Chapter 27 
 Michael Mark
 Chris Marker (1921–2012)Sans Soleil
 Yannis Markopoulos
 Richard Marriott
 Branford Marsalis (born 1960)
 Wynton Marsalis (born 1961)
 George Martin (1926–2016)Yellow Submarine, Live and Let Die
 Jerry Martin
 Cliff Martinez (born 1954)Sex, Lies, and Videotape, Solaris, Kafka
 Jean Martinon
 Richard Marvin
 J Mascis
 John Massari
 Massive Attack (formed 1988)Danny the Dog, Bullet Boy, Battle in Seattle, Gomorrah
 Diego Masson
 Toshio Masuda
 Muir Mathieson
 Hayato Matsuo
 Masaya Matsuura
 Dave Matthews
 Siegfried Matthus (1934–2021)
 Billy May (1916–2014)
 Brian May
 Simon May (born 1944)EastEnders, Howards' Way
 Curtis Mayfield (1942–1999)Superfly
 Toshiro Mayuzumi
 Dennis McCarthy (born 1945)
 Paul McCartney (born 1942)
 Craig McConnell
 Bear McCreary (born 1979)
 Nathan McCree
 Keff McCulloch
 Gary McFarland
 Rory McFarlane
 Don McGlashan
 Bill McGuffie
 David McHugh (born 1941)
 Tim McIntire
 Rod McKuen
 Joel McNeely (born 1959)
 Joe Meek
 DJ Mehdi
 Brad Mehldau
 Edmund Meisel (born 1894–1930)The Battleship Potemkin
 Gil Mellé (1931–2004)The Andromeda Strain, My Sweet Charlie, Columbo
 Peter Rodgers Melnick (Born 1958)
 Nami Melumad (born 1988)
 Mike Melvoin (1937–2012)
 Wendy Melvoin (born 1964)Heroes, Dangerous Minds, Crossing Jordan
 Loy Mendonsa
 Alan Menken (born 1949)
 Dean Menta
 Johnny Mercer (1909–1976)
 Freddie Mercury
 Wim Mertens
 Mateo Messina (born 1972)
 Dominic Messinger
 Metric
 Micki Meuser
 Mickey J. Meyer
 Lanny Meyers
 Michel Michelet (1894–1995)
 Guy Michelmore
 Mario Migliardi
 Darius Milhaud
 Mladen Milicevic
 Helen Miller (1925–2006)
 Marcus Miller (born 1959)
 Randy Miller
 Robyn Miller
 Mario Millo
 Chieli Minucci (born 1958)
 Paul Misraki
 Shyamal Mitra
 Shinkichi Mitsumune
 Shinji Miyazaki
 Hajime Mizoguchi
 Vic Mizzy (1916–2009)
 Moby
 Cyril J. Mockridge (1896–1979)
 Mocky (born 1974)Carole & Tuesday, UFO in Her Eyes
 Mogwai
 Ghulam Mohammed
 Madan Mohan
 S. Mohinder
 Shantanu Moitra – October (soundtrack)
 Charlie Mole
 Niclas Molinder (born 1955)
 Paddy Moloney
 Money Mark
 Francis Monkman
 Egil Monn-Iversen
 Hugo Montenegro (1925–1981)
 Guy Moon (born 1962)
 Anthony Moore
 Dudley Moore (1935–2002)
 Lennie Moore
 Michael Moran (born 1948)
 Alissa Moreno
 Gaby Moreno (born 1981)
 Mark Morgan (born 1961)
 Akihiko Mori
 Nobuhiko Morino
 Angela Morley (1924–2008)Watership Down, The Slipper and the Rose, The Lady Is a Square
 Giorgio Moroder (born 1940)Midnight Express, Flashdance, American Gigolo, Scarface (1983 film), Impressionen unter Wasser
 Jerome Moross (1913–1983)
 Andrea Morricone (born 1964)Cinema Paradiso, Capturing the Friedmans
 Ennio Morricone (1928–2020)A Fistful of Dollars, For a Few Dollars More, The Good, the Bad and the Ugly, The Untouchables
 John Morris (1926–2018)
 Trevor Morris (born 1970)
 Bob Mothersbaugh (born 1952)
 Mark Mothersbaugh (born 1950)The Royal Tenenbaums, The Life Aquatic with Steve Zissou, Rugrats, Crash Bandicoot, Hotel Transylvania, Cloudy with a Chance of Meatballs
 Rob Mounsey
 Leszek Możdżer (born 1971)Nienasycenie, 1 000 000 $, Discover Chopin
 Dominic Muldowney (born 1952)Nineteen Eighty-Four, Sharpe, Copenhagen
 Mugison (born 1976)A Little Trip to Heaven
 Nico Muhly (born 1981)The Reader, Margaret
 Manas Mukherjee
 Hemanta Kumar Mukhopadhyay
 Mark Mueller (born 1957)
 Pankaj Mullick
 David Munrow
 Vano Muradeli
 Rika MuranakaMetal Gear Solid, Metal Gear Solid 2: Sons of Liberty, Metal Gear Solid 3: Snake Eater
 John Murphy (born 1965)28 Days Later, Lock, Stock and Two Smoking Barrels, Sunshine, Kick-###
 Walter Murphy (born 1952)
 Sean Murray
 Selma MutalThe Milk of Sorrow, The Vanished Elephant, Madeinusa, Undertow – Contracorriente,
 Stanley Myers (1930–1993)The Deer Hunter, The Voyager, The Witches

N 

 Kōtarō Nakagawa
 Masato Nakamura (born 1958)Sonic the Hedgehog, Sonic the Hedgehog 2
 Takayuki Nakamura
 Desmond Nakano
 Naked Lunch
 Gianna Nannini
 Akihiko Narita
 José Luis Narom (born 1963)21 with 40, La noche del escorpión, Memorias de atracos, Una visita inquietante
 Michiko Naruke
 Mario Nascimbene
 Nash the Slash
 Nashad
 Naushad Ali
 Javier Navarrete
 O. P. Nayyar
 Chris Neal
 Blake Neely (born 1969)
 Oliver Nelson (1932–1975)
 Neo (formed 1998)Kontroll
 Michael Nesmith
 Olga Neuwirth
 New Order (formed 1980)Control
 Ira Newborn (born 1945)
 Alfred Newman (1900–1970)The King and I, Mother Wore Tights, Love Is a Many-Splendored Thing, How the West Was Won, Airport
 David Newman (born 1954)Bill & Ted's Excellent Adventure, The Freshman, Ice Age, Frankenweenie
 Emil Newman (1911–1984)
 Joey Newman (born 1976)
 Lionel Newman (1916–1989)
 Randy Newman (born 1943)Ragtime, The Natural, Meet the Parents, Toy Story, A Bug's Life, Monsters, Inc., Cars 1 and 3, The Princess and the Frog, The Meyerowitz Stories, Marriage Story
 Thomas Newman (born 1955)Little Women, The Shawshank Redemption, American Beauty, Finding Nemo, WALL-E
 Mbongeni Ngema
 David Nichtern (born 1948)
 Bruno Nicolai (1926–1991)
 Lennie Niehaus (1929–2020)
 Tomohito Nishiura
 Joy Nilo
 Harry Nilsson (1941–1994)
 Jack Nitzsche (1937–2000)
 Yuji Nomi
 Ehsaan Noorani
 Per Nørgård
 Graeme Norgate
 Monty Norman (1928–2022)
 Alex North (1910–1991)Spartacus, Cleopatra (1963), Who's Afraid of Virginia Woolf?, Dragonslayer
 Christopher North
 Julian Nott (born 1960)
 The Notwist
 Jesse Novak
 Michael Nyman (born 1944)
 Molly Nyman

O 

 Karen O (born 1978)Where the Wild Things Are, Jackass Number Two
 Seán Ó Riada (1931–1971)
 Gerald O'Brien
 Richard O'Brien (born 1942)Shock Treatment
 Greg O'Connor
 Martin O'Donnell (born 1955)Halo, Myth, Destiny, Oni, Golem
 Tom O'Horgan (1924–2009)
 Walter O'Keefe (1900–1983)
 Sharon O'Neill (born 1952)
 Paul Oakenfold (born 1963)Swordfish, Appleseed, FIFA Football 2005, FIFA 06, FIFA 07, AOG IV:Dogs Flag, Vexille, Nobel Son
 Erkan Oğur (born 1954)The Bandit, Toss-Up
 Hisayoshi Ogura
 Mike Oldfield (born 1953)
 William Olvis (1958–2014)
 Orbital (formed 1989)Event Horizon, Octane, Pusher
 Norman Orenstein (born 1945)American Psycho 2, Diary of the Dead, Cube 2: Hypercube
 Shinji Orito (born 1973)
 Buxton Orr (1924–1997)
 Riz Ortolani (1931–2014)Cannibal Holocaust, Africa Addio, Mondo cane
 Atli Örvarsson (born 1970)
 Leslie Osborne (1905–1990)
 Michiru Oshima (born 1961)Ico, Legend of Legaia, Arc the Lad, Fullmetal Alchemist
 Osibisa (formed 1969)Superfly T.N.T.
 Kow Otani (born 1957)Gamera: Guardian of the Universe, Shadow of the Colossus, Godzilla, Mothra and King Ghidorah: Giant Monsters All-Out Attack, Mobile Suit Gundam Wing
 Alex Otterlei (born 1968)Xyanide, Totems
 John Ottman (born 1964)The Usual Suspects, Fantastic Four, Snow White: A Tale of Terror, I Have No Mouth, and I Must Scream, X2
 Vyacheslav Ovchinnikov (1936–2019)Ivan's Childhood, Andrei Rublev, War and Peace
 Mark OvendenYolngu Boy
 Reg Owen (1921–1978)Very Important Person, Payroll
 Attila Özdemiroğlu (1943–2016)Night Journey, Akrebin Yolculuğu

P 

 Craig PadillaPhobias, Realms of Blood, Dark Woods
 Mauro Pagani
 Gene Page
 Jimmy Page
 Marty Paich (1925–1995)
 Owen Pallett
 Shelly Palmer
 Alan Parker
 Clifton Parker
 Elizabeth Parker
 Jim Parker (born 1934)
 Dean Parks
 Gordon Parks
 Van Dyke Parks (born 1943)
 Arvo Pärt
 Ioan Gyuri Pascu
 Johnny Pate
 Anthony Pateras
 R. P. Patnaik
 Shawn Patterson (born 1965)
 Mike Patton
 Arun Paudwal
 Alex Paul
 Charles Paul (1902–1990)
 Gene de Paul
 Johnny Pearson (1925–2011)
 Gunner Møller Pedersen
 Bernard Peiffer
 Ahmad Pejman
 Borja Penalba
 Krzysztof Penderecki
 Michael Penn
 Talip Peshkepia (born 1984)
 Heitor Pereira
 Frank Perkins
 Coleridge-Taylor Perkinson
 Jean-Jacques Perrey (1929–2016)
 Brendan Perry
 William P. Perry
 Joacim Persson (born 1971)
 Jean-Claude Petit
 Goffredo Petrassi
 Tom Petty
 Sudhir Phadke
 Phantom Planet
 Barrington Pheloung
 Art Phillips
 Britta Phillips
 John Phillips
 Stu Phillips (born 1929)
 Winifred Phillips
 The Phoenix Foundation
 Lucian Piane
 Ástor Piazzolla
 Piero Piccioni
 Stéphane Picq
 Enrico Pieranunzi
 Franco Piersanti
 Jason Pierce
 Tom Pierson
 Pink Floyd
 Antonio Pinto
 Ernest Pintoff (1931–2002)
 Nicola Piovani
 Douglas Pipes
 Plaid
 Plan B
 Michael Richard Plowman (born 1965)
 Ego Plum (born 1975)
 Terry Plumeri
 Dmitry Pokrass
 Pier Paolo Polcari
 Basil Poledouris (1945–2006)Conan the Barbarian, RoboCop, Lonesome Dove, The Hunt for Red October, Free Willy
 Robert Pollard
 David Pomeranz
 Gillo Pontecorvo
 Jocelyn Pook
 Popol Vuh (formed 1970)Aguirre, the Wrath of God, Heart of Glass, Nosferatu the Vampyre, Fitzcarraldo, Cobra Verde
 Gavriil Nikolayevich Popov
 Steve Porcaro (born 1957)
 Pornosonic
 Michel Portal
 Cole Porter
 Dave Porter 
 Rachel Portman
 Mike Post (born 1944)
 E.S. Posthumus (2000–2010)numerous music for film trailers and TV
 Oscar Potoker
 Sally Potter
 Andrew Powell
 John Powell (born 1963)Bourne, The Road to El Dorado, Shrek, How to Train Your Dragon, Kung Fu Panda 1 and 2, Ice Age: The Meltdown, Dawn of the Dinosaurs, and Continental Drift, Happy Feet 1 and 2, Antz, Chicken Run, Robots, Horton Hears a Who!, Rio 1 and 2, Ferdinand, Bolt, The Lorax
 Devi Sri Prasad
 Pray for Rain
 Zbigniew Preisner
 Don Preston
 André Previn
 Dory Previn
 Alan Price
 Andy Price
 Michael Price
 Prince
 Robert Prince
 Pritam
 Spencer Proffer (born 1948)
 Sergei Prokofiev (1891–1953)Ivan the Terrible, Alexander Nevsky, Lieutenant Kijé
 Craig Pruess
 Alec Puro (born 1975)The Art of Getting By, The Street Stops Here

Q 

 Donald Quan (born 1962)
 Queen (formed 1971)Flash Gordon, Highlander
 Quintessence (formed 1969)Midnight

R 

 R.E.M. (1980–2011)Man on the Moon
 Jaan Rääts (1932–2020)Aeg elada, aeg armastada, Ohtlikud mängud
 Peer Raben (1940–2007)Berlin Alexanderplatz, The Marriage of Maria Braun, Querelle, Veronika Voss, Lili Marleen
 Trevor Rabin (born 1954)Con Air, Armageddon, Gone in 60 Seconds
 James Rado (1932–2022)
 Robert O. Ragland (1931–2002)
 A. R. Rahman (born 1967)Roja, Pudhiya Mugam, Gentleman, Kizhakku Cheemayile, Uzhavan, Thiruda Thiruda, Duet, May Madham, Kadhalan, Karuththamma, Bombay, Indira, Rangeela, Muthu, Indian, Minsara Kanavu, Iruvar, Jeans, Dil Se.., 1947: Earth, Taal, Thakshak, Taj Mahal, Mudhalvan, Alaipayuthey, Kandukondain Kandukondain, Rhythm, Zubeidaa, Lagaan, Kannathil Muthamittal, Warriors of Heaven and Earth, Aayutha Ezhuthu, Swades, Rang De Basanti, Guru, Elizabeth: The Golden Age, Jodhaa Akbar, Jaane Tu... Ya Jaane Na, Ghajini, Slumdog Millionaire, Couples Retreat, Vinnaithaandi Varuvaayaa, Raavan, Enthiran, 127 Hours, Rockstar, People Like Us, Jab Tak Hai Jaan, Kadal, Million Dollar Arm, The Hundred-Foot Journey, Tamasha
 Rajan–Nagendra
 David Raksin (1912–2004)
 Brian Ralston
 Ron Ramin (born 1953)
 Sid Ramin (1919–2019)
 S. Rajeswara Rao
 Ernö Rapée
 Joe Raposo (1937–1989)
 Roop Kumar Rathod
 François Rauber
 Raveendran
 Ravi
 Simon Ravn
 Alan Rawsthorne
 Satyajit Ray
 Ray Reach
 Mike Reagan (born 1950)
 Alto Reed
 Emil Reesen (1887–1964)
 Alan ReevesKill Bill Vol. 2,  To Walk with Lions, The Call of the Wild: Dog of the Yukon, Dr. Bethune, Young Ivanhoe, Ocean Oasis, A Young Connecticut Yankee in King Arthur's Court, Natural Enemy, For Hire, Nico the Unicorn, OWD BOB, Out of Control 
Mathias Rehfeldt (born 1986)
 Dirk Reichardt
 Bill Reichenbach Jr. (born 1949)
 Ernst Reijseger
 Niki Reiser
 Paul Reiser
 Brian Reitzell
 Franz Reizenstein
 Joe Renzetti (born 1941)
 Mike Renzi (1941–2021)
 Himesh Reshammiya
 Dino ResidbegovicCameraperson
 The Residents
 Graeme Revell (born 1955)
 Gian Piero Reverberi
 Silvestre Revueltas
 Graham Reynolds
 Trent Reznor (born 1965)Quake, The Social Network, The Girl with the Dragon Tattoo, Natural Born Killers, Lost Highway, Gone Girl, Soul, Mank
 Rheostatics
 Rick Rhodes (1951–2005)
 Andi Rianto
 Fred Rich
 Neil Richardson
 Max Richter
 Nelson Riddle (1921–1985)
 Stan Ridgway (born 1954)
 Kevin Riepl
 Hugo Riesenfeld
 Diana Ringo
 Waldo de los Ríos (1934–1977)Savage Pampas, La residencia, A Town Called Hell, ¿Quién Puede Matar A Un Niño?
 Stephen Rippy
 Laza Ristovski
 Lolita Ritmanis (born 1962)
 Paul Robb
 Richard Robbins
 Andy Roberts
 Jamie Robertson
 J. Peter Robinson (born 1945)
 Nile Rodgers
 Robert Rodriguez
 Heinz Eric Roemheld
 Roger Roger
 David Rolfe
 Shorty Rogers (1924–1994)
 Sonny Rollins (born 1930)Alfie
 Alejandro Román
 Alain Romans
 Douglas Romayne
 Sigmund Romberg
 Philippe Rombi
 Manuel Romero
 Paul Romero
 Jeff Rona (born 1957)
 Lior Ron
 Ann Ronell (1906–1993)The Story of G.I. Joe, Love Happy, One Touch of Venus
 David Rose (1910–1990)
 Earl Rose (born 1946)
 Leonard Rosenman (1924–2008)East of Eden, Rebel Without a Cause, Fantastic Voyage, The Lord of the Rings
 Laurence RosenthalClash of the Titans, Peter the Great
 Roshan
 Lior Rosner
 Atticus Ross (born 1968)Touching Evil, New York, I Love You, The Book of Eli, The Social Network, The Girl with the Dragon Tattoo
 Leopold RossTouching Evil, New York, I Love You, The Book of Eli
 William Ross
 Renzo Rossellini
 Hubert Rostaing
 Nino Rota (1911–1979)La Strada, La Dolce Vita, The Godfather
 Arnie RothBarbie as Rapunzel, Barbie as the Princess and the Pauper
 Judy Rothman
 Glen Roven
 Hahn Rowe
 Bruce Rowland (born 1942)
 Miklós Rózsa (1907–1995)Spellbound, Quo Vadis, Ben-Hur, King of Kings
 Michael Rubin (born 1963)
 Michel Rubini (born 1942)
 Arthur B. Rubinstein (1931–2008)
 Donald Rubinstein
 John Rubinstein (born 1946)
 Harry Ruby
 Steve Rucker (born 1949)
 Sandrine Rudaz
 Pete Rugolo (1915–2011)
 Mark Russell
 Jeff Russo (born 1969)
 Carlo Rustichelli
 Paolo Rustichelli
 Mark Rutherford
 Alexey Rybnikov
 RZA (born 1969)Ghost Dog: The Way of the Samurai, Kill Bill: Volume 1, Afro Samurai

S 

 S.E.N.S. (formed 1988)A City of Sadness, xxxHolic, Kurau Phantom Memory
 Haim Saban (usually credited as Kussa Mahchi)
 Danny Saber (born 1966)Blade II, The Limey
 Shigeaki Saegusa
 Craig Safan (born 1948)The Last Starfighter, Fade to Black, Cheers
 Jamie Saft
 Toshihiko Sahashi
 Camille Saint-Saëns (1835–1921)The Assassination of the Duke of Guise
 Ryuichi Sakamoto
 Salim–Sulaiman
 Hans J. Salter
 Michael Salvatori
 Leonard Salzedo
 Adnan Sami
 George Sanger (born 1957)Wing Commander, Ultima Underworld: The Stygian Abyss, The 7th Guest
 John Sangster
 Stéphane Sanseverino
 Carlos Santana
 Gustavo Santaolalla (born 1951)Brokeback Mountain, Amores perros, Babel
 Cláudio Santoro
 Philippe Sarde
 David Sardy
 Eric Satie (1866–1925)Entr'acte
 Masaru Sato
 Naoki Satō
 Tenpei Sato
 Jordi Savall
 Domenico Savino
 Kan Sawada
 Nitin Sawhney
 Paul Sawtell (1906–1971)
 Walter Scharf (1910–2003)
 Glenn SchellenbergZero Patience
 Victor Schertzinger
 Peter Schickele (born 1935)Silent Running, Where the Wild Things Are
 Lalo Schifrin (born 1932)Mission: Impossible, Cool Hand Luke, Bullitt, Dirty Harry
 Adam Schlesinger (1967–2020)
 Glenn Schloss (born 1972)
 Irmin Schmidt
 Johannes Schmoelling
 Enjott Schneider (born 1950)March of Millions, Stalingrad, Brother of Sleep, 23
 Helge Schneider
 Alfred Schnittke
 Gaili Schoen
 Arnold Schoenberg Accompaniment to a Cinematographic Scene 
 Eberhard Schoener
 Schoolly D (born 1966)New Rose Hotel
 Scott Schreer (born 1953)
 Norbert Schultze
 Klaus Schulze (born 1947)Angst, Body Love, Le Moulin de Daudet
 Walter Schumann (1913–1958)
 Sigi Schwab
 David Schwartz
 Stephen Schwartz
 Garry Schyman
 Gary S. Scott (born 1953)
 John Scott
 Tom Scott (born 1948)
 Vincent Scotto
 Peter Sculthorpe
 Humphrey Searle (1915–1982)The Haunting
 Sebastian (born 1949)You Are Not Alone
 Sebastian (born 1981)Steak, Our Day Will Come
 Misha SegalThe Phantom of the Opera, The New Adventures of Pippi Longstocking, The Last Dragon
 Bernardo Segall (1911–1993)
 Mátyás Seiber (1905–1960)Animal Farm
 Mark Seibert
 Ilona Sekacz
 Tsuyoshi Sekito
 Bert Selen (born 1985)
 Jun Senoue
 Seppuku Paradigm (formed 2005)Martyrs, Eden Log, Red Nights
 Alex Seropian
 Éric Serra
 Arban Severin
 Steven Severin (born 1955)Visions of Ecstasy, Delphinium: A Childhood Portrait of Derek Jarman
 Thomas Edward Seymour
 Kyriakos Sfetsas
 Marc Shaiman
 Vladimir Shainsky
 Gingger Shankar
 Ravi ShankarTransmigration Macabre 
 Ray Shanklin
 Shantel
 Theodore Shapiro
 Jamshied Sharifi
 Shark
 Mani Sharma
 Monty Sharma
 Edward Shearmur
 Bert Shefter
 Duncan Sheik (born 1969)A Home at the End of the World, Through the Fire
 William Sheller
 Richard M. Sherman
 Robert B. Sherman
 Tetsuya Shibata
 Leroy Shield
 Kevin Shields
 Sumio Shiratori
 David Shire (born 1937)
 Sxip ShireyStatuesque
 Shogakukan
 Howard Shore (born 1946)
 Ryan Shore
 Clinton Shorter (born 1971)
 Dmitri Shostakovich
 Aadesh Shrivastava
 Shudder to Think
 Leo Shuken
 Mort Shuman
 Louis Siciliano
 Steve Sidwell
 Valgeir Sigurðsson
 Kazimierz Sikorski
 Carlo Siliotto
 Louis Silvers
 Alan Silvestri (born 1950)Predator, Outrageous Fortune, Who Framed Roger Rabbit, Back to the Future Part II, Father of the Bride, The Bodyguard, Grumpy Old Men, Forrest Gump, Eraser
 Samuel Sim
 Zoran Simjanović
 Carly Simon
 Claudio Simonetti
 Rob Simonsen (born 1978)
 Madan Gopal Singh
 Uttam Singh
 16Volt
 Lucijan Marija Škerjanc
 Frank Skinner
 Leland Sklar
 Andys Skordis
 Józef Skrzek
 Cezary Skubiszewski
 Wikluh Sky (born 1980)A Serbian Film
 Michael Small
 Bruce Smeaton
 Paul J. Smith
 Mark Snow (born 1946)
 Sofa SurfersKomm, süßer Tod, Silentium, Der Knochenmann
 Sohail Sen (born 1984)Khelein Hum Jee Jaan Sey
 Martial Solal (born 1927)Breathless
 Jason Solowsky
 Stephen Sondheim
 Sonic MayhemQuake II, Tomorrow Never Dies, Hellgate: London
 Warrick Sony
 Nicolás Sorín
 Pablo Sorozábal
 Ondřej Soukup
 André Souris
 J. D. Souther
 Leonid Soybelman
 Stamatis Spanoudakis
 Benjamin Speed
 Sam Spence
 Herbert W. Spencer (1905–1992)
 Carl Stalling (1891–1972)
 Stuart A. Staples
 Herman Stein (1915–2007)
 Ronald Stein
 Fred Steiner (1923–2001)
 Max Steiner
 Aage Stentoft
 Stereo Total
 Liam Sternberg
 Cat Stevens
 Leith Stevens (1909–1970)
 Morton Stevens (1929–1991)
 David A. Stewart
 Diego Stocco
 Karlheinz Stockhausen
 Ethan Stoller
 Robert Stolz
 Richard Stone (1953–2001)
 Herbert Stothart
 Patricia Lee Stotter
 Keith Strachan
 Matthew Strachan
 Billy Straus
 Oscar Straus
 John Strauss
 Charles Strouse (born 1928)
 Joe Strummer
 Ike Stubblefield
 Andy Sturmer (born 1965)
 Cong Su
 Dinesh Subasinghe
 Morton Subotnick (born 1933)Dreamwood
 Michael Suby
 Jeff Sudakin
 Harry Sukman
 Andy Summers
 Sun City Girls
 Keiichi Suzuki
 Georgy Sviridov
 Karel Svoboda
 John Swihart (born 1964)
 Mola Sylla
 Władysław Szpilman (1911–2000)Swit, dzien i noc Palestyny, Doktór Murek, Wrzos, Co rekne zena?
 Shantanu Moitra – October (soundtrack)

T 

 Mousse T. (born 1966)Pornorama
 Germaine Tailleferre (1892–1983)Ces dames aux chapeaux verts, Two Timid Souls, Le Petit Chose
 Tōru Takemitsu (1930–1996)Ran, Dodes'ka-den, Woman in the Dunes, Pitfall, The Face of Another, Empire of Passion, Kwaidan
 Tom Talbert (1924–2005)
 Joby Talbot (born 1971)The Hitchhiker's Guide to the Galaxy, The League of Gentlemen's Apocalypse, Franklyn
 Frédéric Talgorn (born 1961)Robot Jox, Fortress, Heavy Metal 2000
 David Tamkin
 Tan Dun (born 1957)Crouching Tiger, Hidden Dragon, Hero, Don't Cry, Nanking, The Banquet
 Kōhei Tanaka (born 1954)Vampire Princess Miyu, Alundra, The Granstream Saga
 Tangerine Dream (formed 1967)Legend, Firestarter, Thief, Sorcerer
 Mikael Tariverdiev
 Brian Tarquin
 John Tavener (1944–2013)Children of Men, Pilgrimage, Battle in Heaven
 Michael Tavera (born 1961)
 Benson Taylor (born 1983)London Fields (film)
 Mick Taylor
 Terry Scott Taylor (born 1950)The Neverhood, Skullmonkeys, Project G.e.e.K.e.R.
 Boris Tchaikovsky
 Team Shanghai Alice
 Jeroen Tel
 Sébastien Tellier
 Bob Telson
 Jack Tempchin
 Tenacious D (formed 1994)Tenacious D in The Pick of Destiny, Tenacious D
 Tenmon (born 1971)She and Her Cat, The Place Promised in Our Early Days, Voices of a Distant Star
 Neil Tennant
 John Tesh (born 1952)
 Jeanine Tesori
 Francois Tetaz
 Alan Tew (born 1950s)
 Third Ear BandAbelard and Heloise, Macbeth
 Mikis Theodorakis (1925–2021)Zorba the Greek, Z, Serpico, State of Siege
 They Might Be Giants
 Maurice Thiriet
 Chance Thomas
 Pete Thomas
 Peter Thomas (1925–2020)Raumpatrouille – Die phantastischen Abenteuer des Raumschiffes Orion, The Big Boss, Chariots of the Gods
 Stuart Michael Thomas
 Virgil Thomson
 Jon Mikl Thor
 Ken Thorne
 Throbbing Gristle (formed 1975)In the Shadow of the Sun
 Billy Thorpe (1946–2007)
 Yann Tiersen
 Tôn-Thất Tiết
 Martin Tillman
 Chris Tilton (born 1979)
 Doug Timm (1960–1989)
 Christopher Tin
 Tindersticks
 Dimitri Tiomkin (1894–1974)High Noon, The Guns of Navarone
 George Tipton (1932–2016)It's a Living, Condo, Benson, Heartland, Empty Nest, Nurses, Soap, The Golden Girls, The Golden Palace, 
 Boris Tishchenko
 Amon Tobin
 Ernst Toch
 Pyotr Todorovsky
 Richard Tognetti
 Magome Togoshi
 Tokyo Ska Paradise Orchestra (formed 1985)Incredible Crisis, Sly Cooper and the Thievius Raccoonus
 James Tomalin
 tomandandyKilling Zoe, Arlington Road, The Hills Have Eyes, Resident Evil: Afterlife
 Tomatito (born 1958)Vengo
 Isao Tomita
 Sheridan Tongue
 Pınar Toprak
 Veljo Tormis
 David Torn
 Raúl de la Torre
 Kazumi Totaka
 Toto (formed 1977)Dune
 Colin Towns
 Kazuhiko Toyama
 Jeff Toyne
 Goran Trajkoski
 Transcenders
 Joseph Trapanese (born 1984)
 Stephen Trask
 Armando Trovaioli
 Amit Trivedi
 Paul Trust
 Andrzej Trzaskowski
 Yuka Tsujiyoko
 Jonathan Tunick
 Tuxedomoon
 Tommy Tycho
 Tom Tykwer
 Brian Tyler (born 1972)
 Jeff Tymoschuk
 Stephanie Tyrell (1949–2003)
 Steve Tyrell (born 1944)
 Christopher Tyng (born 1968)
 Gerald Tyrwhitt-Wilson, 14th Baron Berners (1883–1950)Nicholas Nickleby, The Halfway House, Champagne Charlie

U 

 Matt Uelmen (born 1972)Diablo, Diablo II, Torchlight
 Nobuo Uematsu (born 1959)Final Fantasy series, Lost Odyssey, Final Fantasy VII Advent Children, Blue Dragon
 Tatsuya Uemura (born 1960)Zero Wing, Sky Shark, Hellfire
 Kōji Ueno (born 1960)Royal Space Force: The Wings of Honnêamise, Imabikisō, Fantastic Children
 Yoko Ueno (born 1963)Gamera the Brave, Brigadoon: Marin & Melan, .hack//Legend of the Twilight
 Özkan Uğur (born 1953)Arkadaşım Şeytan
 Shigeru Umebayashi (born 1951)In the Mood for Love, 2046, House of Flying Daggers, Tears for Sale
 Piero Umiliani (1926–2001)Sweden: Heaven and Hell, Boccaccio '70, I soliti ignoti
 Underworld (formed 1980)Breaking and Entering, Sunshine
 Christof Unterberger (born 1970)Der Anschlag, Stabat, I Love in You
 Jacques Urbont
 Vladimir Ussachevsky (1911–1990)No Exit, Line of Apogee
 Teo Usuelli (1920–2009)Dillinger Is Dead, The Ape Woman, L'udienza

V 

 Steve Vai (born 1960)Crossroads, Bill & Ted's Bogus Journey, Encino Man
 Bebo Valdés
 Gary Valenciano
 Frank Valentini
 Nils-Aslak Valkeapää
 Jonne Valtonen
 David Vanacore
 Vangelis (1943–2022)Blade Runner, 1492: Conquest of Paradise, Chariots of Fire, Alexander, L'Apocalypse des animaux
 Melvin Van Peebles
 David Van Tieghem
 John Van Tongeren (born 1951)
 Henryk Wars (1902–1977) Exile to Siberia, Flipper (1963 film), Daktari
 Ralph Vaughan Williams (1872–1958)Scott of the Antarctic, 49th Parallel, Coastal Command, The Flemish Farm, Stricken Peninsula, The Loves of Joanna Godden, The England of Elizabeth
 Ben VaughnThat '70s Show, 3rd Rock from the Sun, Psycho Beach Party, Black Mask
 John Veale (1922–2006)
 Eddie Vedder (born 1964)Into The Wild
 Herman van Veen
 Cris Velasco
 Caetano Veloso
 James L. Venable
 G K Venkatesh
 S.P. Venkatesh
 Stéphane Venne
 Peter Vermeersch
 Vertexguy
 Mike Vickers (born 1940)
 Vidyasagar
 Tommy Vig (born 1938)They Call Me Bruce?, The Kid with the Broken Halo, Starsky and Hutch: Sweet Sixteen, Texas Lightning, Ruckus, Forced Entry, Nightmare Circus, Doctors' Hospital, This Is the Life
 Vishal Bhardwaj (born 1960)Omkara, Kaminey
 Emil Viklický
 Heitor Villa-Lobos
 Dado Villa-Lobos
 Tony Vilgotsky
 Ramesh Vinayakam
 Carl Vine
 Anandji Virji Shah
 Kalyanji Virji Shah
 Vishal–Shekhar
 M. S. Viswanathan
 José María Vitier
 Roman Vlad (1919–2013)
 Tolis Voskopoulos
 Neil D. Voss
 Richard VreelandIt Follows, Under the Silver Lake, Triple Frontier (film)
 Chris Vrenna
 Henny Vrienten

W 

 Waddy Wachtel (born 1947)Up in Smoke, Joe Dirt, Paul Blart: Mall Cop
 Kaoru Wada
 Derek Wadsworth
 Loudon Wainwright III
 Tom Waits
 Rick Wakeman
 W. G. Snuffy Walden (born 1960)
 Mark Walk
 Scott Walker
 Shirley Walker (1945–2006)
 Simon Walker
 Jack Wall
 Benjamin Wallfisch (born 1979)Blade Runner 2049, A Cure for Wellness, Hidden Figures, Annabelle: Creation, It, It Chapter Two, Shazam!, The Invisible Man
 Wallace CollectionLa Maison
 William Walton
 Nathan Wang
 Wang Chung
 Wang Qiang
 Thomas Wanker
 War (formed 1969)Youngblood
 Stephen Warbeck (born 1953)Shakespeare in Love, A Christmas Carol, Quills, Mrs Brown
 Edward Ward
 Kyle Ward
 Dean Wareham
 Régis Wargnier
 Diane Warren (born 1956)
 Mervyn Warren (born 1964)
 Henryk Wars (1902–1977)
 Don Was
 Ned Washington (1901–1971)
 Ron Wasserman (born 1961)Mighty Morphin Power Rangers, X-Men: The Animated Series, Dragon Ball Z, America's Next Top Model
 Toshiyuki Watanabe
 Roger Waters
 Mark Watters (born 1955)
 Franz Waxman (1906–1967)Sunset Boulevard, Bride of Frankenstein, Rebecca, A Place in the Sun, Rear Window
 Dwayne Wayans
 Jeff Wayne
 Brian Wayy
 Jimmy Webb (born 1946)
 Roy Webb
 Konstantin Wecker
 Craig Wedren
 Mieczysław Weinberg
 Edwin Wendler
 Wendy & Lisa
 Walter Werzowa
 Fred Wesley
 Bugge Wesseltoft
 Mel Wesson
 Nigel Westlake
 David Whitaker
 Richard A. Whiting
 Alec Wilder
 Guy Whitmore
 David Whittaker
 George Whitty
 Frederik Wiedmann
 Zygmunt Wiehler
 Clarence Wijewardena
 Gert Wilden
 Matthew Wilder
 George Wilkins
 Simon Wilkinson
 Steve Willaert
 Charles Williams
 Jim Williams
 John Williams (born 1932)Jaws, Star Wars, Close Encounters of the Third Kind, Superman, Raiders of the Lost Ark, E.T. the Extra-Terrestrial, Indiana Jones and the Last Crusade, Hook, Jurassic Park, Schindler's List, Saving Private Ryan, Artificial Intelligence: A.I., Harry Potter and the Philosopher's Stone, Catch Me If You Can, Memoirs of a Geisha, The Adventures of Tintin: The Secret of the Unicorn, Lincoln
 Joseph Williams (born 1960)
 Patrick Williams (1939–2018)
 Paul Williams (born 1940)
 Timothy Williams
 Malcolm Williamson
 Meredith Willson
 Mortimer Wilson
 Nancy Wilson
 Jamin Winans
 Sam Winans
 Herbert Windt
 Kirk Winterrowd
 Jean Wiener
 David Wise
 Debbie Wiseman
 Jozef van Wissem
 Charles Wolcott
 Peter Wolf
 Richard Wolf
 Jonathan Wolff (born 1958)
 Byron Wong
 Christopher Wong
 Raymond Wong Ying-Wah
 Ronnie Wood
 Dan Wool
 John Wooldridge
 Lyle Workman
 Tim Wright
 Allie Wrubel
 Alex Wurman
 Robert Wyatt
 Bill Wyman
 Timothy Michael Wynn

X 

 Stavros Xarchakos (born 1939)Rembetiko, The Dark Side of the Sun, Signs of Life
 Iannis Xenakis (1922–2001)The Thessaloniki World Fair
 Xian Xinghai (1905–1945)Yan'an and the Eighth Route Army

Y 

 Shoji Yamashiro (born 1933)Akira
 Akira Yamaoka (born 1968)Silent Hill, Silent Hill: Revelation with Jeff Danna, Kuso with Flying Lotus and Aphex Twin
 Stomu Yamashta (born 1947)
 Yanni (born 1954)
 Gabriel Yared (born 1949)
 Eikichi Yazawa (born 1949)
 Peyman Yazdanian (born 1968)
 Wandly Yazid (1925–2005)
 Jack Yellen (1892–1991)
 Yello
 Narciso Yepes (1927–1997)
 Gary Yershon (born 1954)
 Michael Yezerski
 Yiruma (born 1978)
 Seiji Yokoyama (1935–2017)
 Yo La Tengo
 Yuji Yoshino
 Christopher Young (born 1957)
 Neil Young (born 1945)
 Victor Young (1899–1956)
 Yuvan Shankar Raja (born 1979)

Z 

 Michael Zager (born 1943)Friday the 13th Part III
 Dorin Liviu Zaharia (1944–1987)
 John Stepan Zamecnik (1872–1953)The Covered Wagon, Wings, Baby Take a Bow, Shanghai Madness
 Geoff Zanelli (born 1974)Hitman, Secret Window with Philip Glass, Disturbia, Once Upon a Time in Queens, Gamer, The Odd Life of Timothy Green, Pirates of the Caribbean: Dead Men Tell No Tales, Christopher Robin with Jon Brion, Maleficent: Mistress of Evil, Black and Blue
 Marcelo Zarvos (born 1969)Hollywoodland, You Kill Me, The Air I Breathe, Winged Creatures, Beastly, The Beaver, Won't Back Down, Dark Waters, Wonder, The Words
 Aleksandr Zatsepin (born 1926)Weather Is Good on Deribasovskaya, It Rains Again on Brighton Beach, 31 June, The Mystery of the Third Planet, Incognito from St. Petersburg, The Orion Loop, Kidnapping, Caucasian Style
 Allan Zavod (1945–2016)
 Paul Zaza (born 1952) Murder by Decree, Prom Night, The Kidnapping of the President, My Bloody Valentine, American Nightmare, A Christmas Story, The Brain, To Catch a Killer, Popcorn, Cold Sweat
 Denny Zeitlin (born 1938)Invasion of the Body Snatchers
 Lev Zhurbin (born 1978)
 Aaron Zigman (born 1963)The Notebook, Step Up, Step Up 2: The Streets, Flicka, Bridge to Terabithia, The Shack, Sex and the City, Sex and the City 2, Raise Your Voice, In the Mix, The Company Men, Madea Goes to Jail, Madea's Big Happy Family, Madea's Witness Protection, For Colored Girls, Mr. Magorium's Wonder Emporium, Akeelah and the Bee
 Winfried Zillig (1905–1963)King for One Night, Sarajevo, The Rider on the White Horse, Violanta
 Hans Zimmer (born 1957)The Lion King, Gladiator, Spanglish, The Dark Knight, Inception, Sherlock Holmes, How Do You Know, The Prince of Egypt, The Road to El Dorado, Spirit: Stallion of the Cimarron, Shark Tale, Megamind,  Interstellar, Pirates of the Caribbean, Madagascar, Kung Fu Panda, The Boss Baby, Batman v Superman: Dawn of Justice, Wonder Woman 1984, Dark Phoenix, Da Vinci Code, Angels and Demons, Rain Man, The Amazing Spider-Man 2, Dunkirk
 Matteo Zingales (born 1980)The Hunter, All Saints, Winners & Losers
 Rob Zombie (born 1969)House of 1000 Corpses, 31
 John Zorn (born 1953)She Must Be Seeing Things, The Golden Boat
 Jeremy Zuckerman (born 1975)Avatar: The Last Airbender, The Last Airbender: Legend of Korra, Scream, Horse Girl
 Inon Zur (born 1965)Rusty: A Dog's Tale, The Vision of Escaflowne, Reclaim, Valley of the Dolls, The Elder Scrolls: Blades, Fallout 3, Fallout 4
 Ralph Zurmühle (born 1959)
 Josiah Zuro (1887–1930)The King of Kings, The Covered Wagon, Holiday
 Otto Zykan (1935–2006)Staatsoperette, Exit... nur keine Panik

References 

Film score
Composers